= Olszówka =

Olszówka may refer to the following places in Poland:

- Olszówka, Lower Silesian Voivodeship (south-west Poland)
- Olszówka, Kuyavian-Pomeranian Voivodeship (north-central Poland)
- Olszówka, Świętokrzyskie Voivodeship (south-central Poland)
- Olszówka, Masovian Voivodeship (east-central Poland)
- Olszówka, Koło County in Greater Poland Voivodeship (central Poland)
- Olszówka, Turek County in Greater Poland Voivodeship (central Poland)
- Olszówka, Kwidzyn County in Pomeranian Voivodeship (north Poland)
- Olszówka, Sztum County in Pomeranian Voivodeship (north Poland)
- Olszówka, Tczew County in Pomeranian Voivodeship (north Poland)
- Olszówka, Warmian-Masurian Voivodeship (north Poland)
- Olszówka, Lesser Poland Voivodeship, in Limanowa County; see Gmina Mszana Dolna
- Olszówka (Bielsko-Biała), a district of Bielsko-Biała, Silesian Voivodeship
