= Józefina =

Józefina may refer to the following places:

- Józefina, Bełchatów County in Łódź Voivodeship (central Poland)
- Józefina, Piotrków County in Łódź Voivodeship (central Poland)
- Józefina, Wieluń County in Łódź Voivodeship (central Poland)
- Józefina, Wieruszów County in Łódź Voivodeship (central Poland)
- Józefina, Świętokrzyskie Voivodeship (south-central Poland)
- Józefina, Masovian Voivodeship (east-central Poland)
- Józefina, Kalisz County in Greater Poland Voivodeship (west-central Poland)
- Józefina, Gmina Przykona in Greater Poland Voivodeship (west-central Poland)
