= Kowale Pańskie =

- Village
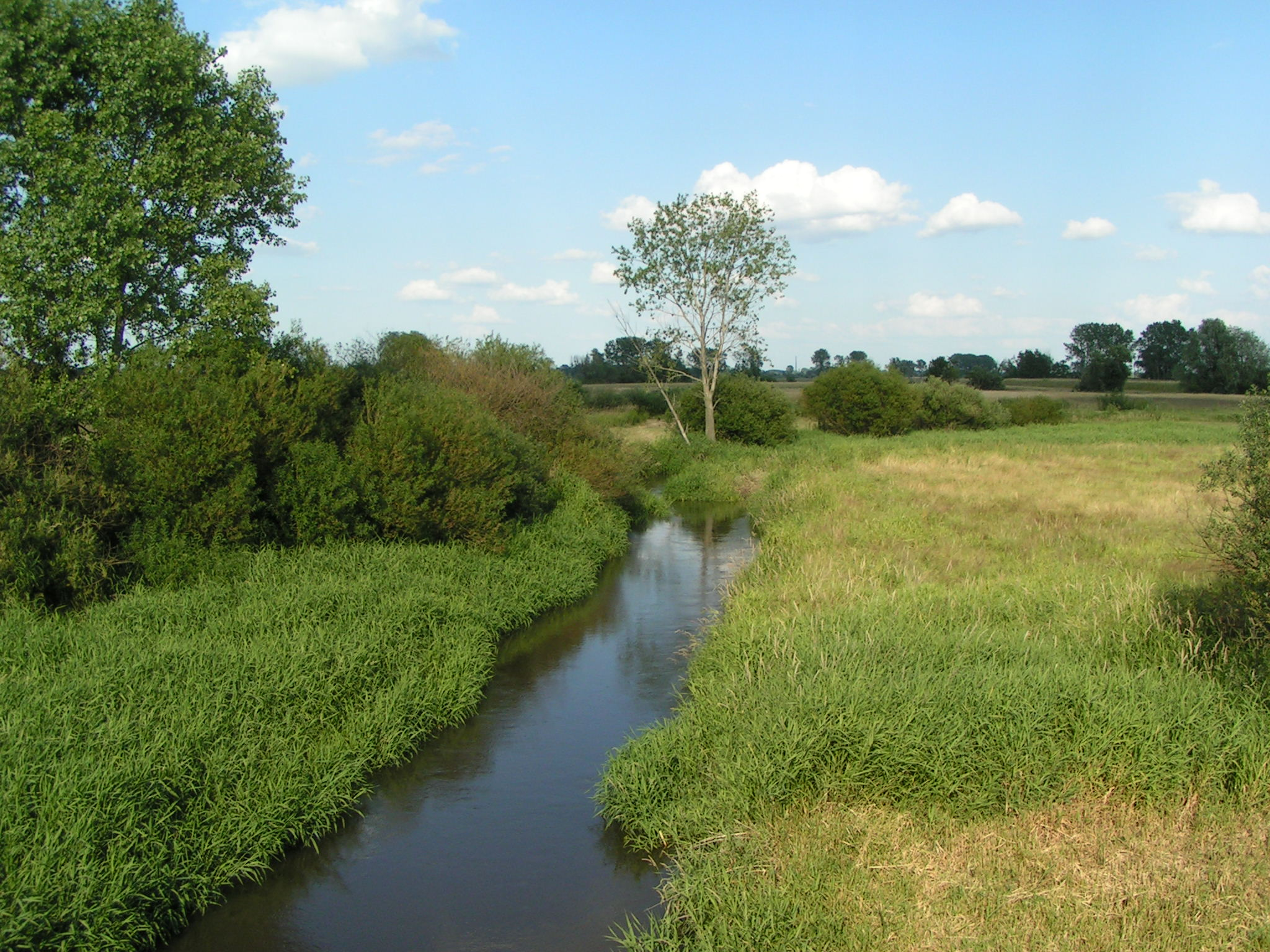
- River Kiełbaska running through northern part of Kowale Pańskie

- Location within Poland
- Coordinates: 51°56′N 18°32′E
- Country: Poland
- Voivodeship: Greater Poland
- County: Turek
- Gmina: Kawęczyn
- Population: 190

Kowale Pańskie (pronounced [kɔˈvalɛ ˈpaj̃skʲɛ]) is a village in the administrative district of Gmina Kawęczyn, within Turek County, Greater Poland Voivodeship, in west-central Poland.

== History ==
Village Kowale existed already in the 13th century. Bought by Archbishop Jakub Świnka around 1280 it remained the property of the Gniezno Archdiocese until the 18th century. The name Kowale appeared in the 17th century, in reference to a community of blacksmiths (kowale in Polish) servicing local market. The church, founded by Antoni Czarnecki, was built in 1847; the church's parish included 12 villages. In mid 19th century, during the Partitions of Poland, the population of Kowale Pańskie (and the adjacent Wola Kowalska) was only 323 people, half of whom lived and worked around the local historic manor (built in 1750), owned by industrialist Robert Schultz who run a steam-powered mill. Kowale Pańskie consisted of 30 farms. The inhabitants was predominantly Polish, with some German and even fewer Jewish families. Following Poland's return to independence Kowale became the county seat (gmina) in 1928 consisting of 59 settlements. Volunteer fire station was built, a school complex (1933), and a community bank (Gminna Kasa Pożyczkowo-Oszczędnościowa).

=== World War II and the Holocaust ===
With the German invasion of Poland at the onset of World War II, Kowale became part of Turek Kreis in Reichsgau Wartheland territory annexed directly to Nazi Germany. Kowale county was chosen as the location of a transit ghetto for Polish Jews from the entire region spanning 16 settlements including Turek. The ghetto – centred around Czachulec – was known in German as Heidemühle in reference to an old windmill standing there; all Polish families were expelled from the zone with younger Poles taken to Germany for slave labour. The Nazis ordered the creation of a single Judenrat council for all Jewish communities together. The ghetto held 3,700 Jews; up to 18 families per each farmhouse living anywhere they could including in barnyards.

In October 1941, SS-Sturmbannführer Herbert Lange chose nearby Kulmhof (now: Chełmno) as the location of the first ever extermination camp. The gas vans manufactured in Berlin were delivered some time in November. On 8 November 1941, all Jews from the Kowale Pańskie Ghetto were herded in the village of Bielawki for a selection. About 1,100 people were declared "incapable of work" and on 13–14 November transported to the death camp in Kulmhof. The younger and stronger men in Kowale were deported to forced labour near Poznań in early 1942, followed by a group of Jewish women. The final liquidation of the ghetto took place on 20 July 1942, when the remaining Jews were sent to Kulmhof, but also murdered outside the village, along with Jewish hospital patients and 12 Jewish policemen. The inhabitants of Babiak, Dąbie, Dęby Szlacheckie, Grodziec, Izbica Kujawska, Kłodawa, Koło, Nowiny Brdowskie, and Sompolno were deported to Kulmhof before March 1943.

== See also ==
- The Holocaust in occupied Poland
