= Miłaczewskie Młyny =

- Village
- Location within Poland
- Coordinates: 51°56′N 18°27′E
- Country: Poland
- Voivodeship: Greater Poland
- County: Turek
- Gmina: Malanów

Miłaczewskie Młyny [miwaˈt͡ʂɛfskʲɛ ˈmwɨnɨ] is a village in the administrative district of Gmina Malanów, within Turek County, Greater Poland Voivodeship, in west-central Poland.
