= Rudniki, Kielce County =

Rudniki
- Village
- Location within Poland
- Coordinates: 50°58′39″N 20°12′39″E
- Country: Poland
- Voivodeship: Świętokrzyskie
- County: Kielce
- Gmina: Łopuszno
- Population: 249

Rudniki [rudˈniki] is a village in the administrative district of Gmina Łopuszno, within Kielce County, Świętokrzyskie Voivodeship, in south-central Poland. It lies approximately 5 km (3 mi) north-west of Łopuszno and 31 km (19 mi) west of the regional capital Kielce.
