= Ewelinów, Świętokrzyskie Voivodeship =

Ewelinów
- Village
- Location within Poland
- Coordinates: 50°57′13″N 20°8′54″E
- Country: Poland
- Voivodeship: Świętokrzyskie
- County: Kielce
- Gmina: Łopuszno
- Population: 166

Ewelinów [ɛvɛˈlinuf] is a village in the administrative district of Gmina Łopuszno, within Kielce County, Świętokrzyskie Voivodeship, in south-central Poland. It lies approximately 8 km (5 mi) west of Łopuszno and 34 km (21 mi) west of the regional capital Kielce.
