= Zagaj, Greater Poland Voivodeship =

Zagaj
- Village
- Location within Poland
- Coordinates: 51°55′16″N 18°41′02″E
- Country: Poland
- Voivodeship: Greater Poland
- County: Turek
- Gmina: Dobra

Zagaj [ˈzaɡai̯] is a village in the administrative district of Gmina Dobra, within Turek County, Greater Poland Voivodeship, in west-central Poland. It is located in the central European Standard Time Zone which is UTC+1.
