= Zborów, Turek County =

Zborów
- Village
- Location within Poland
- Coordinates: 51°52′31″N 18°39′23″E
- Country: Poland
- Voivodeship: Greater Poland
- County: Turek
- Gmina: Dobra

Zborów [ˈzbɔruf] is a village in the administrative district of Gmina Dobra, within Turek County, Greater Poland Voivodeship, in west-central Poland.
