= Jeziorko, Greater Poland Voivodeship =

Jeziorko
- Settlement
- Location within Poland
- Coordinates: 52°1′N 18°37′E
- Country: Poland
- Voivodeship: Greater Poland
- County: Turek
- Gmina: Przykona

Jeziorko [jɛˈʑɔrkɔ] is a settlement in the administrative district of Gmina Przykona, within Turek County, Greater Poland Voivodeship, in west-central Poland.
