= Wielebnów =

- Village
- Location within Poland
- Coordinates: 50°57′16″N 20°15′46″E
- Country: Poland
- Voivodeship: Świętokrzyskie
- County: Kielce
- Gmina: Łopuszno
- Population: 398

Wielebnów [vjɛˈlɛbnuf] is a village in the administrative district of Gmina Łopuszno, within Kielce County, Świętokrzyskie Voivodeship, in south-central Poland. It lies approximately 2 km (1 mi) north-east of Łopuszno and 27 km (17 mi) west of the regional capital Kielce.
