= Głuchów, Turek County =

Głuchów
- Village
- Church of Saint Matthias in Głuchów

- Location within Poland
- Coordinates: 51°52′N 18°34′E
- Country: Poland
- Voivodeship: Greater Poland
- County: Turek
- Gmina: Kawęczyn
- Time zone: UTC+1 (CET)
  - Summer (DST): UTC+2 (CEST)
- Vehicle registration: PTU

Głuchów [ˈɡwuxuf] is a village in the administrative district of Gmina Kawęczyn, within Turek County, Greater Poland Voivodeship, in central Poland.

Five Polish citizens were murdered by Nazi Germany in the village during World War II.
