= Wietchinin =

- Village
- Location within Poland
- Coordinates: 51°57′18″N 18°33′16″E
- Country: Poland
- Voivodeship: Greater Poland
- County: Turek
- Gmina: Turek
- Population: 287

Wietchinin [vjɛtˈxinin] is a village in the administrative district of Gmina Turek, within Turek County, Greater Poland Voivodeship, in west-central Poland.
