= Snochowice =

- Village
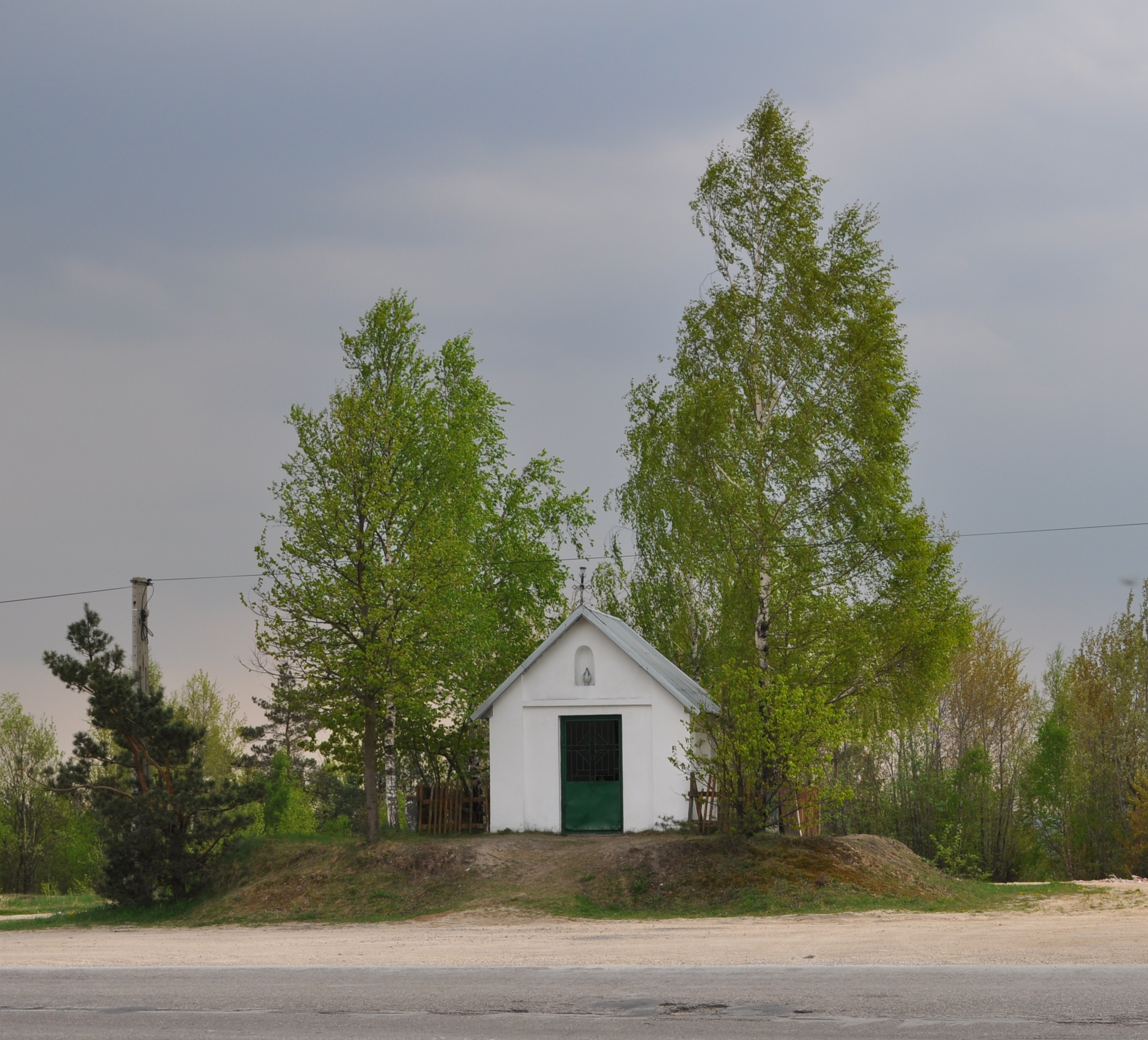
- Chapel

- Location within Poland
- Coordinates: 50°56′52″N 20°18′11″E
- Country: Poland
- Voivodeship: Świętokrzyskie
- County: Kielce
- Gmina: Łopuszno
- Population: 567

Snochowice [snɔxɔˈvit͡sɛ] is a village in the administrative district of Gmina Łopuszno, within Kielce County, Świętokrzyskie Voivodeship, in south-central Poland. It lies approximately 4 km (2 mi) east of Łopuszno and 24 km (15 mi) west of the regional capital Kielce.
