= Tokary Pierwsze =

- Village
- Location within Poland
- Coordinates: 51°52′N 18°32′E
- Country: Poland
- Voivodeship: Greater Poland
- County: Turek
- Gmina: Kawęczyn
- Population: 220

Tokary Pierwsze [tɔˈkarɨ ˈpjɛrfʂɛ] is a village in the administrative district of Gmina Kawęczyn, within Turek County, Greater Poland Voivodeship, in west-central Poland.
