= Szymany, Greater Poland Voivodeship =

Szymany
- Village
- Location within Poland
- Coordinates: 51°55′22″N 18°40′14″E
- Country: Poland
- Voivodeship: Greater Poland
- County: Turek
- Gmina: Dobra

Szymany (Polish pronunciation: [ʂɨˈmanɨ]) is a village in the administrative district of Gmina Dobra, within Turek County, Greater Poland Voivodeship, in west-central Poland.
