= Młodzianów =

Młodzianów may refer to the following places in Poland:

- Młodzianów, Lower Silesian Voivodeship (south-west Poland)
- Młodzianów, Greater Poland Voivodeship (west-central Poland)
