= Wrząca, Turek County =

Wrząca
- Village
- Location within Poland
- Coordinates: 52°1′N 18°25′E
- Country: Poland
- Voivodeship: Greater Poland
- County: Turek
- Gmina: Turek
- Population: 273

Wrząca [ˈvʐɔnt͡sa] is a village in the administrative district of Gmina Turek, within Turek County, Greater Poland Voivodeship, in west-central Poland.
