= Januszówka, Greater Poland Voivodeship =

Januszówka
- Village
- Location within Poland
- Coordinates: 51°53′50″N 18°40′57″E
- Country: Poland
- Voivodeship: Greater Poland
- County: Turek
- Gmina: Dobra

Population
  - Total: 102
- Time zone: UTC+1 (CET)
  - Summer (DST): UTC+2 (CEST)

Januszówka [januˈʂufka] is a village in the administrative district of Gmina Dobra, within Turek County, Greater Poland Voivodeship, in central Poland.
