= Kolnica, Gmina Malanów =

Kolnica
- Village
- Location within Poland
- Coordinates: 51°57′31″N 18°27′18″E
- Country: Poland
- Voivodeship: Greater Poland
- County: Turek
- Gmina: Malanów

Kolnica [kɔlˈnit͡sa] is a village in the administrative district of Gmina Malanów, within Turek County, Greater Poland Voivodeship, in west-central Poland.
