= Ostrówek, Turek County =

Ostrówek
- Village
- Location within Poland
- Coordinates: 51°53′N 18°36′E
- Country: Poland
- Voivodeship: Greater Poland
- County: Turek
- Gmina: Dobra
- Time zone: UTC+1 (CET)
  - Summer (DST): UTC+2 (CEST)

Ostrówek [ɔsˈtruvɛk] is a village in the administrative district of Gmina Dobra, within Turek County, Greater Poland Voivodeship, in central Poland.
