= Józefów, Gmina Dobra =

Village in Turek County, Poland

Józefów
- Village
- Location within Poland
- Coordinates: 51°55′17″N 18°45′17″E
- Country: Poland
- Voivodeship: Greater Poland
- County: Turek
- Gmina: Dobra

Józefów (Polish pronunciation: [juˈzɛfuf]) is a village in the administrative district of Gmina Dobra, within Turek County, Greater Poland Voivodeship, in west-central Poland.
