= Bibianna, Greater Poland Voivodeship =

Bibianna
- Village
- Location within Poland
- Coordinates: 52°0′N 18°18′E
- Country: Poland
- Voivodeship: Greater Poland
- County: Turek
- Gmina: Malanów
- Population: 258

Bibianna [biˈbjanna] is a village in the administrative district of Gmina Malanów, within Turek County, Greater Poland Voivodeship, in west-central Poland.
