= Ugory =

Ugory may refer to the following places:

- Ugory, Greater Poland Voivodeship (west-central Poland)
- Ugory, Lublin Voivodeship (east Poland)
- Ugory, West Pomeranian Voivodeship (north-west Poland)
