= Paździerowice =

- Village
- Location within Poland
- Coordinates: 51°58′N 18°27′E
- Country: Poland
- Voivodeship: Greater Poland
- County: Turek
- Gmina: Malanów

Paździerowice [paʑd͡ʑɛrɔˈvit͡sɛ] is a village in the administrative district of Gmina Malanów, within Turek County, Greater Poland Voivodeship, in west-central Poland.
