= Żeroniczki =

- Village
- Location within Poland
- Coordinates: 51°57′N 18°37′E
- Country: Poland
- Voivodeship: Greater Poland
- County: Turek
- Gmina: Przykona
- Time zone: UTC+1 (CET)
  - Summer (DST): UTC+2 (CEST)
- Vehicle registration: PTU

Żeroniczki [ʐɛrɔˈnit͡ʂki] is a village in the administrative district of Gmina Przykona, within Turek County, Greater Poland Voivodeship, in central Poland.
