= Kaczki Średnie =

- Village
- Location within Poland
- Coordinates: 51°58′N 18°32′E
- Country: Poland
- Voivodeship: Greater Poland
- County: Turek
- Gmina: Turek
- Population: 400

Kaczki Średnie [ˈkat͡ʂki ˈɕrɛdɲɛ] is a village in the administrative district of Gmina Turek, within Turek County, Greater Poland Voivodeship, in west-central Poland.
