= Potworów =

Potworów may refer to the following places in Poland:

- Potworów, Lower Silesian Voivodeship (south-west Poland)
- Potworów, Masovian Voivodeship (east-central Poland)
  - Potworów PGR, also within Przysucha County, Masovian Voivodeship, in east-central Poland
- Potworów, Greater Poland Voivodeship (central Poland)
