= Piekary, Turek County =

Piekary
- Village
- Location within Poland
- Coordinates: 51°53′N 18°42′E
- Country: Poland
- Voivodeship: Greater Poland
- County: Turek
- Gmina: Dobra
- Time zone: UTC+1 (CET)
  - Summer (DST): UTC+2 (CEST)
- Vehicle registration: PTU

Piekary [pjɛˈkarɨ] is a village in the administrative district of Gmina Dobra, within Turek County, Greater Poland Voivodeship, in central Poland.

Three Polish citizens were murdered by Nazi Germany in the village during World War II.
