= Długa Wieś, Turek County =

Długa Wieś
- Village
- Location within Poland
- Coordinates: 51°55′15″N 18°36′15″E
- Country: Poland
- Voivodeship: Greater Poland
- County: Turek
- Gmina: Dobra

Długa Wieś [ˈdwuɡa ˈvjɛɕ] is a village in the administrative district of Gmina Dobra, within Turek County, Greater Poland Voivodeship, in west-central Poland.
