= Sarbice Pierwsze =

- Village
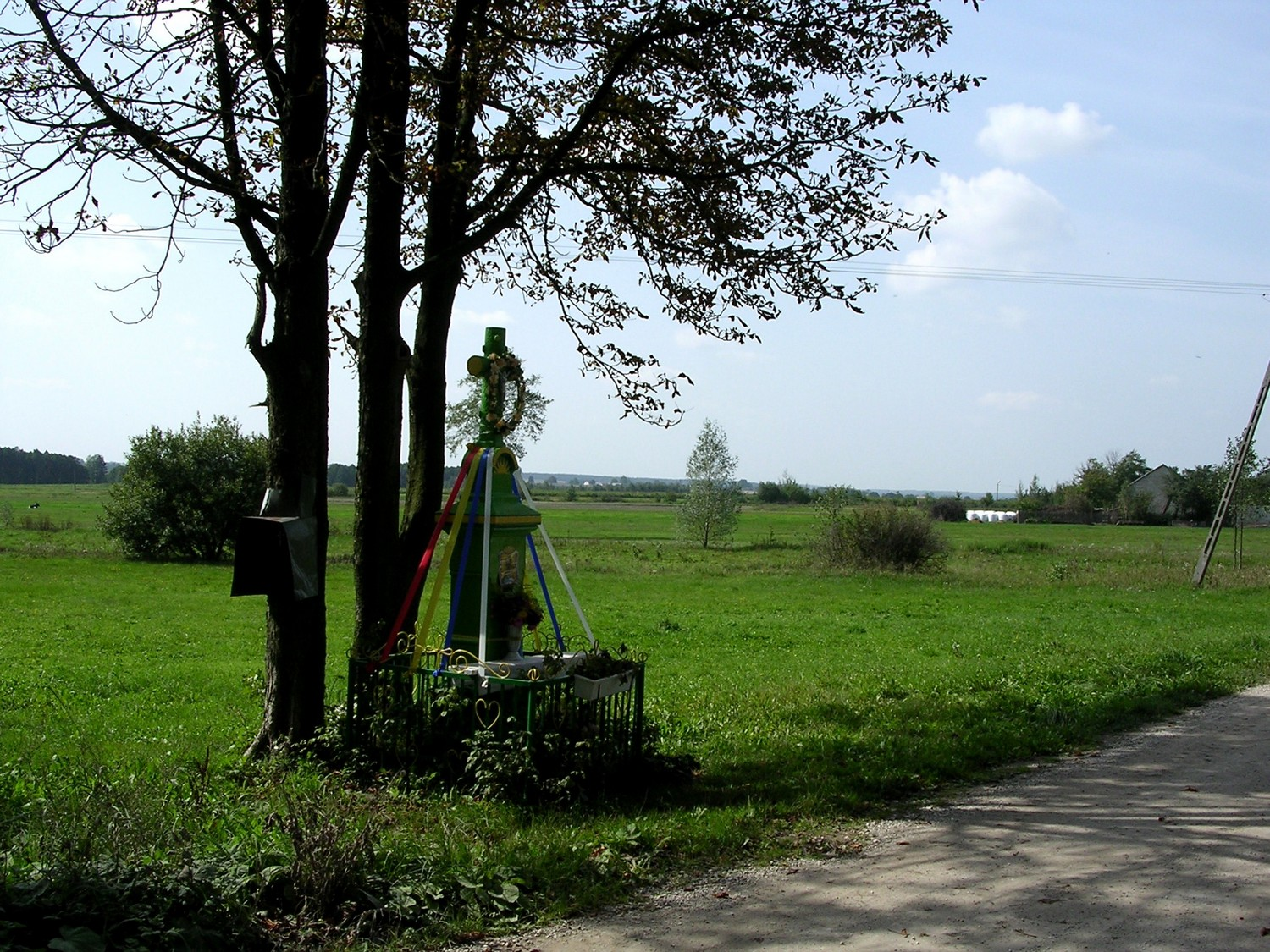
- Wayside shrine

- Location within Poland
- Coordinates: 50°59′14″N 20°15′27″E
- Country: Poland
- Voivodeship: Świętokrzyskie
- County: Kielce
- Gmina: Łopuszno
- Population: 290

Sarbice Pierwsze [sarˈbit͡sɛ ˈpjɛrfʂɛ] is a village in the administrative district of Gmina Łopuszno, within Kielce County, Świętokrzyskie Voivodeship, in south-central Poland. It lies approximately 5 km (3 mi) north of Łopuszno and 28 km (17 mi) north-west of the regional capital Kielce.
