= Marianów, Kielce County =

Marianów
- Village
- Location within Poland
- Coordinates: 50°54′31″N 20°13′27″E
- Country: Poland
- Voivodeship: Świętokrzyskie
- County: Kielce
- Gmina: Łopuszno
- Population: 249

Marianów [maˈrjanuf] is a village in the administrative district of Gmina Łopuszno, within Kielce County, Świętokrzyskie Voivodeship, in south-central Poland. It lies approximately 5 km (3 mi) south-west of Łopuszno and 28 km (17 mi) west of the regional capital Kielce.
