= Rogów, Greater Poland Voivodeship =

Rogów
- Village
- Location within Poland
- Coordinates: 51°59′N 18°34′E
- Country: Poland
- Voivodeship: Greater Poland
- County: Turek
- Gmina: Przykona

Rogów [ˈrɔɡuf] is a village in the administrative district of Gmina Przykona, within Turek County, Greater Poland Voivodeship, in west-central Poland.
