= Miłaczew Kolonia =

- Village
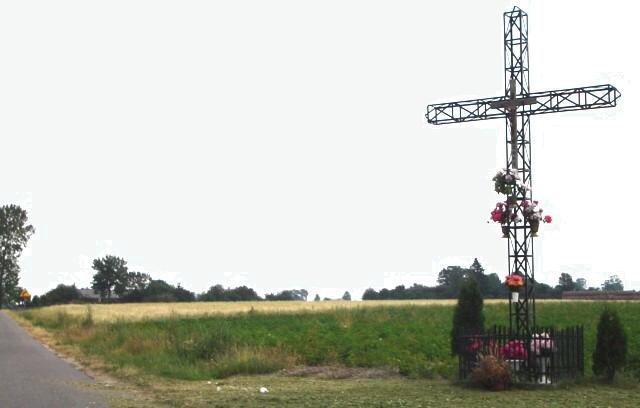

- Location within Poland
- Coordinates: 51°56′N 18°24′E
- Country: Poland
- Voivodeship: Greater Poland
- County: Turek
- Gmina: Malanów

Miłaczew Kolonia [miˈwat͡ʂɛf kɔˈlɔɲa] is a village in the administrative district of Gmina Malanów, within Turek County, Greater Poland Voivodeship, in west-central Poland.
