= Czałczyn =

- Village
- Location within Poland
- Coordinates: 50°58′18″N 20°14′40″E
- Country: Poland
- Voivodeship: Świętokrzyskie
- County: Kielce
- Gmina: Łopuszno
- Population: 287

Czałczyn [ˈt͡ʂau̯t͡ʂɨn] is a village in the administrative district of Gmina Łopuszno, within Kielce County, Świętokrzyskie Voivodeship, in south-central Poland. It lies approximately 3 km (2 mi) north of Łopuszno and 28 km (17 mi) west of the regional capital Kielce.
