= Niedźwiady, Turek County =

Niedźwiady
- Village
- Location within Poland
- Coordinates: 51°54′17″N 18°27′06″E
- Country: Poland
- Voivodeship: Greater Poland
- County: Turek
- Gmina: Malanów

Niedźwiady [ɲɛd͡ʑˈvjadɨ] is a village in the administrative district of Gmina Malanów, within Turek County, Greater Poland Voivodeship, in west-central Poland.
