= Żdżary, Turek County =

Żdżary
- Village
- Location within Poland
- Coordinates: 51°52′N 18°28′E
- Country: Poland
- Voivodeship: Greater Poland
- County: Turek
- Gmina: Kawęczyn

Żdżary [ˈʐd͡ʐarɨ] is a village in the administrative district of Gmina Kawęczyn, within Turek County, Greater Poland Voivodeship, in west-central Poland.
