= Jasień, Gmina Łopuszno =

Jasień
- Village
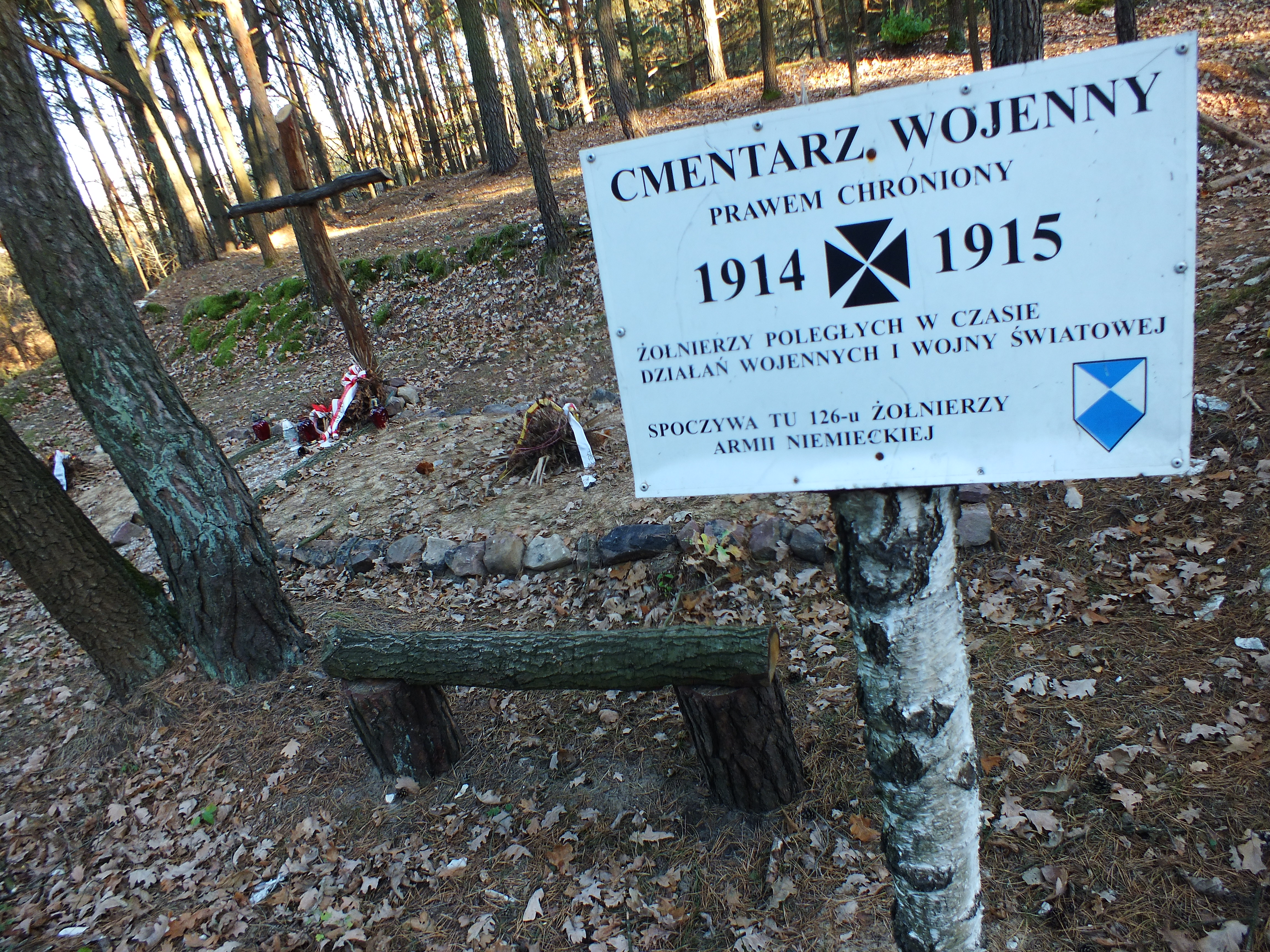
- War cemetery

- Location within Poland
- Coordinates: 50°57′12″N 20°13′46″E
- Country: Poland
- Voivodeship: Świętokrzyskie
- County: Kielce
- Gmina: Łopuszno
- Population: 213

Jasień [ˈjaɕɛɲ] is a village in the administrative district of Gmina Łopuszno, within Kielce County, Świętokrzyskie Voivodeship, in south-central Poland. It lies approximately 2 km (1 mi) west of Łopuszno and 29 km (18 mi) west of the regional capital Kielce.
