= Miłkowice =

Miłkowice may refer to:

- Miłkowice, Lower Silesian Voivodeship (south-west Poland)
- Miłkowice, Greater Poland Voivodeship (central Poland)
