= Grabków =

Grabków or Grąbków may refer to the following places:

- Grabków, Łódź Voivodeship (central Poland)
- Grabków, Końskie County in Świętokrzyskie Voivodeship (south-central Poland)
- Grabków, Starachowice County in Świętokrzyskie Voivodeship (south-central Poland)
- Grabków, Lubusz Voivodeship (west Poland)
- Grąbków, Greater Poland Voivodeship (west-central Poland)
