= Wojciechów, Greater Poland Voivodeship =

Wojciechów
- Village
- Location within Poland
- Coordinates: 51°53′38″N 18°31′0″E
- Country: Poland
- Voivodeship: Greater Poland
- County: Turek
- Gmina: Kawęczyn

Wojciechów (Polish pronunciation: [vɔjˈt͡ɕɛxuf]) is a village in the administrative district of Gmina Kawęczyn, within Turek County, Greater Poland Voivodeship, in west-central Poland.
