= Ruda Zajączkowska =

- Village
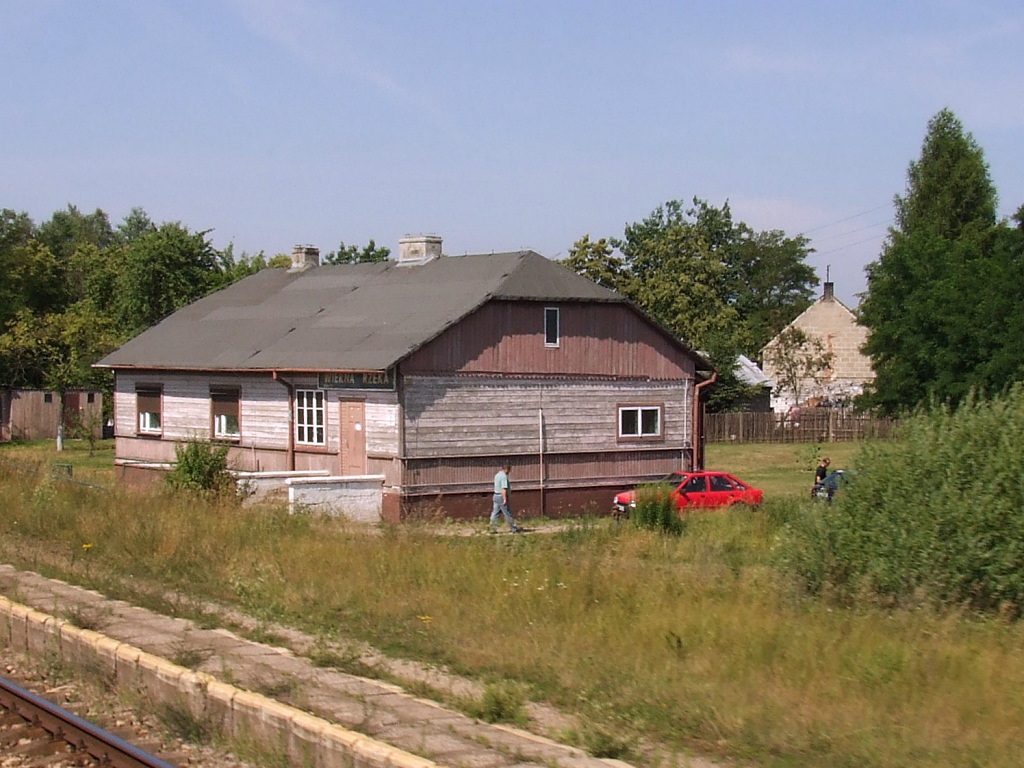

- Location within Poland
- Coordinates: 50°52′23″N 20°18′19″E
- Country: Poland
- Voivodeship: Świętokrzyskie
- County: Kielce
- Gmina: Łopuszno
- Population: 380

Ruda Zajączkowska [ˈruda zajɔnt͡ʂˈkɔfska] is a village in the administrative district of Gmina Łopuszno, within Kielce County, Świętokrzyskie Voivodeship, in south-central Poland. It lies approximately 10 km (6 mi) south-east of Łopuszno and 22 km (14 mi) west of the regional capital Kielce.
