= Popielarze, Turek County =

Popielarze
- Village
- Location within Poland
- Coordinates: 51°59′12″N 18°23′02″E
- Country: Poland
- Voivodeship: Greater Poland
- County: Turek
- Gmina: Malanów

Popielarze [pɔpjɛˈlaʐɛ] is a village in the administrative district of Gmina Malanów, within Turek County, Greater Poland Voivodeship, in west-central Poland.
