= Sarbice Drugie =

- Village
- Location within Poland
- Coordinates: 51°0′3″N 20°15′24″E
- Country: Poland
- Voivodeship: Świętokrzyskie
- County: Kielce
- Gmina: Łopuszno
- Population: 322

Sarbice Drugie [sarˈbit͡sɛ ˈdruɡʲɛ] is a village in the administrative district of Gmina Łopuszno, within Kielce County, Świętokrzyskie Voivodeship, in south-central Poland. It lies approximately 6 km (4 mi) north of Łopuszno and 29 km (18 mi) north-west of the regional capital Kielce.
