= Chlebów, Greater Poland Voivodeship =

Chlebów
- Village
- Location within Poland
- Coordinates: 52°1′3″N 18°34′45″E
- Country: Poland
- Voivodeship: Greater Poland
- County: Turek
- Gmina: Turek
- Population: 316

Chlebów [ˈxlɛbuf] is a village in the administrative district of Gmina Turek, within Turek County, Greater Poland Voivodeship, in west-central Poland.
