= Podewsie =

- Village
- Location within Poland
- Coordinates: 50°58′2″N 20°20′48″E
- Country: Poland
- Voivodeship: Świętokrzyskie
- County: Kielce
- Gmina: Łopuszno
- Population: 137

Podewsie [pɔˈdɛfɕɛ] is a village in the administrative district of Gmina Łopuszno, within Kielce County, Świętokrzyskie Voivodeship, in south-central Poland. It lies approximately 8 km (5 mi) east of Łopuszno and 22 km (14 mi) north-west of the regional capital Kielce.
