= Targówka, Greater Poland Voivodeship =

Targówka
- Village
- Location within Poland
- Coordinates: 51°57′48″N 18°26′0″E
- Country: Poland
- Voivodeship: Greater Poland
- County: Turek
- Gmina: Malanów
- Population: 318

Targówka [tarˈɡufka] is a village in the administrative district of Gmina Malanów, within Turek County, Greater Poland Voivodeship, in west-central Poland.
