= Rzymsko BG =

- Village
- Location within Poland
- Coordinates: 51°52′06″N 18°35′54″E
- Country: Poland
- Voivodeship: Greater Poland
- County: Turek
- Gmina: Dobra

Rzymsko BG is a village in the administrative district of Gmina Dobra, within Turek County, Greater Poland Voivodeship, in west-central Poland.
