= Czartoszowy =

- Village
- Location within Poland
- Coordinates: 50°54′18″N 20°15′18″E
- Country: Poland
- Voivodeship: Świętokrzyskie
- County: Kielce
- Gmina: Łopuszno
- Population: 218

Czartoszowy [t͡ʂartɔˈʂɔvɨ] is a village in the administrative district of Gmina Łopuszno, within Kielce County, Świętokrzyskie Voivodeship, in south-central Poland. It lies approximately 5 km (3 mi) south of Łopuszno and 26 km (16 mi) west of the regional capital Kielce.
