= Ciemień =

- Village
- Location within Poland
- Coordinates: 51°55′10″N 18°32′03″E
- Country: Poland
- Voivodeship: Greater Poland
- County: Turek
- Gmina: Kawęczyn

Ciemień [ˈt͡ɕɛmjɛɲ] is a village in the administrative district of Gmina Kawęczyn, within Turek County, Greater Poland Voivodeship, in west-central Poland.
