= Tokary Drugie =

- Village
- Location within Poland
- Coordinates: 51°52′46″N 18°31′8″E
- Country: Poland
- Voivodeship: Greater Poland
- County: Turek
- Gmina: Kawęczyn
- Population: 120

Tokary Drugie [tɔˈkarɨ ˈdruɡʲɛ] is a village in the administrative district of Gmina Kawęczyn, within Turek County, Greater Poland Voivodeship, in west-central Poland.
