= Skęczniew =

- Village
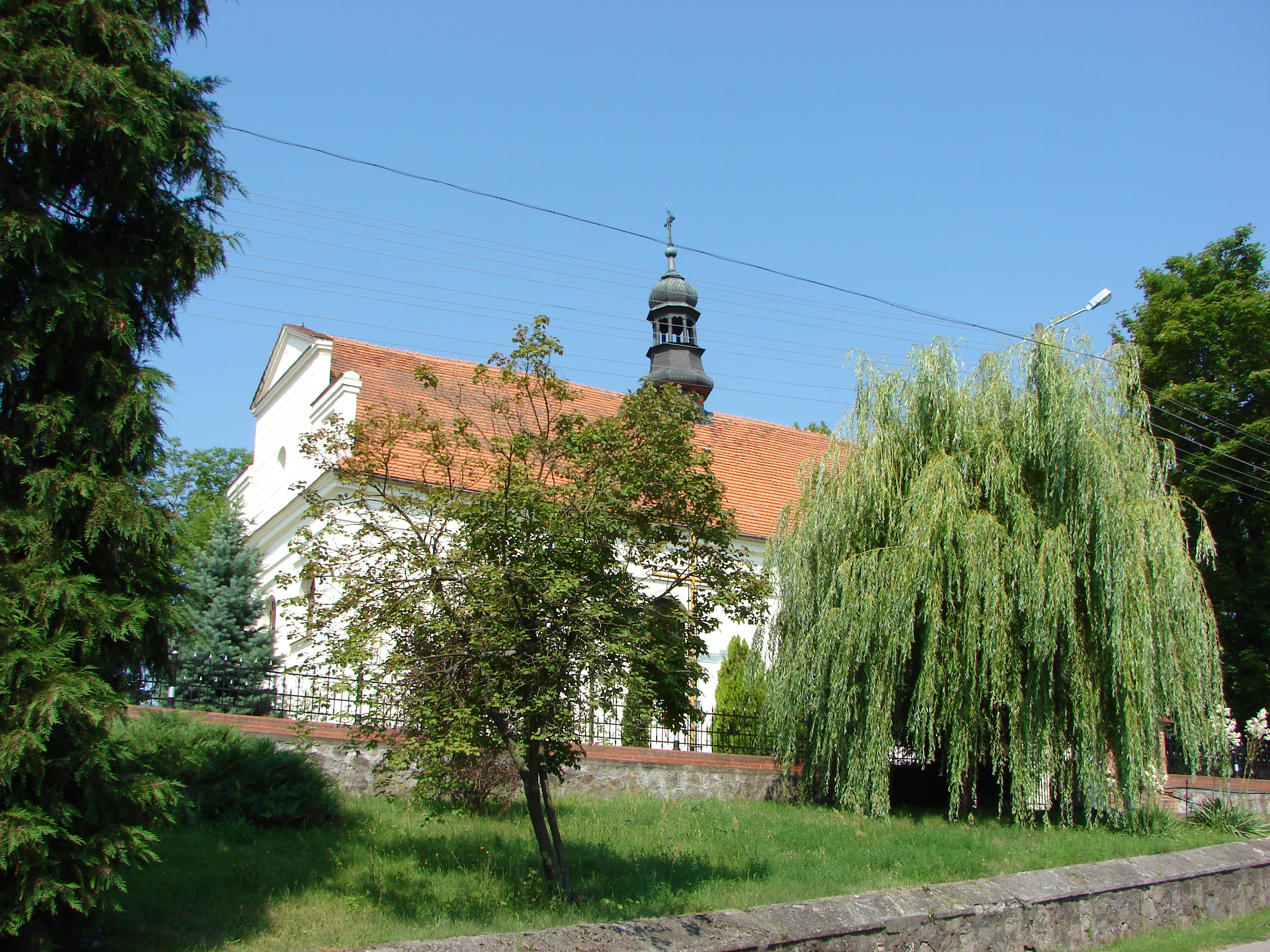
- The Holy Trinity church from 1825

- Location within Poland
- Coordinates: 51°52′N 18°41′E
- Country: Poland
- Voivodeship: Greater Poland
- County: Turek
- Gmina: Dobra
- Population: 430

Skęczniew [ˈskɛnt͡ʂɲɛf] is a village in the administrative district of Gmina Dobra, within Turek County, Greater Poland Voivodeship, in west-central Poland.
