= Radyczyny-Kolonia =

- Settlement
- Location within Poland
- Coordinates: 52°00′26″N 18°43′16″E
- Country: Poland
- Voivodeship: Greater Poland
- County: Turek
- Gmina: Przykona
- Time zone: UTC+1 (CET)
  - Summer (DST): UTC+2 (CEST)
- Vehicle registration: PTU

Radyczyny-Kolonia [radɨˈt͡ʂɨnɨ kɔˈlɔɲa] is a settlement in the administrative district of Gmina Przykona, within Turek County, Greater Poland Voivodeship, in central Poland.
