= Jedle, Świętokrzyskie Voivodeship =

Jedle
- Village
- Location within Poland
- Coordinates: 50°55′41″N 20°13′33″E
- Country: Poland
- Voivodeship: Świętokrzyskie
- County: Kielce
- Gmina: Łopuszno
- Population: 337

Jedle [ˈjɛdlɛ] is a village in the administrative district of Gmina Łopuszno, within Kielce County, Świętokrzyskie Voivodeship, in south-central Poland. It lies approximately 3 km (2 mi) south-west of Łopuszno and 28 km (17 mi) west of the regional capital Kielce.
