= Cisew Mały =

- Village
- Location within Poland
- Coordinates: 51°59′N 18°27′E
- Country: Poland
- Voivodeship: Greater Poland
- County: Turek
- Gmina: Turek

Cisew Mały [ˈt͡ɕisɛf ˈmawɨ] is a village in the administrative district of Gmina Turek, within Turek County, Greater Poland Voivodeship, in west-central Poland.
