= Nowy Świat (disambiguation) =

Nowy Świat (meaning "New World" in Polish) is a street in Warsaw.

Nowy Świat may also refer to the following places in Poland:

- Nowy Świat, part of the Stare Miasto district of Kraków
- Nowy Świat, Konin County in Greater Poland Voivodeship (west-central Poland)
- Nowy Świat, Nowy Tomyśl County in Greater Poland Voivodeship (west-central Poland)
- Nowy Świat, Kościan County in Greater Poland Voivodeship (west-central Poland)
- Nowy Świat, Leszno County in Greater Poland Voivodeship (west-central Poland)
- Nowy Świat, Gmina Kawęczyn in Greater Poland Voivodeship (west-central Poland)
- Nowy Świat, Gmina Tuliszków in Greater Poland Voivodeship (west-central Poland)
- Nowy Świat, Lublin Voivodeship (east Poland)
- Nowy Świat, Poddębice County in Łódź Voivodeship (central Poland)
- Nowy Świat, Wieluń County in Łódź Voivodeship (central Poland)
- Nowy Świat, Międzyrzecz County in Lubusz Voivodeship (west Poland)
- Nowy Świat, Zielona Góra County in Lubusz Voivodeship (west Poland)
- Nowy Świat, Masovian Voivodeship in Masovian Voivodeship (east-central Poland)
- Nowy Świat, Opole Voivodeship (south-west Poland)
- Nowy Świat, Pomeranian Voivodeship (north Poland)
- Nowy Świat ship canal, Vistula Spit, Northern Poland
