= Eustachów =

- Village
- Location within Poland
- Coordinates: 50°55′54″N 20°16′0″E
- Country: Poland
- Voivodeship: Świętokrzyskie
- County: Kielce
- Gmina: Łopuszno
- Population: 400

Eustachów [ɛusˈtaxuf] is a village in the administrative district of Gmina Łopuszno, within Kielce County, Świętokrzyskie Voivodeship, in south-central Poland. It lies approximately 3 km (2 mi) south-east of Łopuszno and 26 km (16 mi) west of the regional capital Kielce.
