= Posoka, Turek County =

Posoka
- Village
- Location within Poland
- Coordinates: 52°2′N 18°41′E
- Country: Poland
- Voivodeship: Greater Poland
- County: Turek
- Gmina: Przykona

Posoka [pɔˈsɔka] is a village in the administrative district of Gmina Przykona, within Turek County, Greater Poland Voivodeship, in west-central Poland.
