= Dzierzazna =

Dzierzazna may refer to the following places in Poland:

- Dzierżązna, Greater Poland Voivodeship
- Dzierżązna, Łódź Voivodeship
- Dzierzązna, Poddębice County, Łódź Voivodeship
- Dzierzązna, Sieradz County, Łódź Voivodeship
- Dzierzązna, Masovian Voivodeship
- Dzierzążna, Lubusz Voivodeship
