= Psary, Turek County =

Psary
- Village
- Location within Poland
- Coordinates: 51°59′N 18°36′E
- Country: Poland
- Voivodeship: Greater Poland
- County: Turek
- Gmina: Przykona
- Population: 240

Psary [ˈpsarɨ] is a village in the administrative district of Gmina Przykona, within Turek County, Greater Poland Voivodeship, in west-central Poland.

== Church and parish ==
The first mention of the parish in Psary dates back to the 14th century. The first church was wooden, built in 1811, funded by J. Watta-Kosiecki, a Konin judge and Psary heir.

The new church, dedicated to the Visitation of the Blessed Virgin Mary, designed by Stanisław Wojciechowski, was built between 1911 and 1913 on the site of the previous church. Its construction was initiated by the then-parish priest, Father Z. Guranowski. It is built in the Art Nouveau style, with a quadrangular tower set into the church façade. The church has three naves.
