= Dzierzbotki =

- Village
- Location within Poland
- Coordinates: 51°55′N 18°31′E
- Country: Poland
- Voivodeship: Greater Poland
- County: Turek
- Gmina: Kawęczyn

Dzierzbotki [d͡ʑɛʐˈbɔtki] is a village in the administrative district of Gmina Kawęczyn, within Turek County, Greater Poland Voivodeship, in west-central Poland.
