= Laski, Turek County =

Laski
- Village
- Location within Poland
- Coordinates: 51°59′N 18°33′E
- Country: Poland
- Voivodeship: Greater Poland
- County: Turek
- Gmina: Przykona
- Time zone: UTC+1 (CET)
  - Summer (DST): UTC+2 (CEST)
- Vehicle registration: PTU

Laski (Polish pronunciation: [ˈlaskʲi]) is a village in the administrative district of Gmina Przykona, within Turek County, Greater Poland Voivodeship, in central Poland.

Two Polish citizens were murdered by Nazi Germany in the village during World War II.
