= Piotrowiec, Świętokrzyskie Voivodeship =

Piotrowiec
- Village
- Location within Poland
- Coordinates: 50°57′20″N 20°20′50″E
- Country: Poland
- Voivodeship: Świętokrzyskie
- County: Kielce
- Gmina: Łopuszno
- Population: 446

Piotrowiec [pjɔˈtrɔvjɛt͡s] is a village in the administrative district of Gmina Łopuszno, within Kielce County, Świętokrzyskie Voivodeship, in south-central Poland. It lies approximately 7 km (4 mi) east of Łopuszno and 21 km (13 mi) north-west of the regional capital Kielce.
