= Kowale Księże =

- Village
- Location within Poland
- Coordinates: 51°58′N 18°30′E
- Country: Poland
- Voivodeship: Greater Poland
- County: Turek
- Gmina: Turek
- Elevation: 57 m (187 ft)
- Population: 398

Kowale Księże [kɔˈvalɛ ˈkɕɛ̃ʐɛ] is a village in the administrative district of Gmina Turek, within Turek County, Greater Poland Voivodeship, in west-central Poland.
