= Będziechów =

- Village
- Location within Poland
- Coordinates: 51°53′N 18°27′E
- Country: Poland
- Voivodeship: Greater Poland
- County: Turek
- Gmina: Kawęczyn

Będziechów [bɛnˈd͡ʑɛxuf] is a village in the administrative district of Gmina Kawęczyn, within Turek County, Greater Poland Voivodeship, in west-central Poland.
