= Kościanki, Turek County =

Kościanki
- Village
- Location within Poland
- Coordinates: 51°51′17″N 18°40′03″E
- Country: Poland
- Voivodeship: Greater Poland
- County: Turek
- Gmina: Dobra

Kościanki [kɔɕˈt͡ɕanki] is a village in the administrative district of Gmina Dobra, within Turek County, Greater Poland Voivodeship, in west-central Poland.
