= Miłaczew, Turek County =

Miłaczew
- Village
- Location within Poland
- Coordinates: 51°56′N 18°24′E
- Country: Poland
- Voivodeship: Greater Poland
- County: Turek
- Gmina: Malanów
- Population: 197

Miłaczew [miˈwat͡ʂɛf] is a village in the administrative district of Gmina Malanów, within Turek County, Greater Poland Voivodeship, in west-central Poland.
