= Turkowice =

Turkowice may refer to the following places in Poland:

- Turkowice, Lublin Voivodeship
- Turkowice, Greater Poland Voivodeship
