= Nowek =

- Village
- Location within Poland
- Coordinates: 50°59′52″N 20°19′36″E
- Country: Poland
- Voivodeship: Świętokrzyskie
- County: Kielce
- Gmina: Łopuszno
- Population: 160

Nowek [ˈnɔvɛk] is a village in the administrative district of Gmina Łopuszno, within Kielce County, Świętokrzyskie Voivodeship, in south-central Poland. It lies approximately 8 km (5 mi) north-east of Łopuszno and 24 km (15 mi) north-west of the regional capital Kielce.
