= Antonielów, Świętokrzyskie Voivodeship =

Antonielów
- Village
- Location within Poland
- Coordinates: 50°56′36″N 20°11′37″E
- Country: Poland
- Voivodeship: Świętokrzyskie
- County: Kielce
- Gmina: Łopuszno
- Population: 196

Antonielów [antɔˈɲɛluf] is a village in the administrative district of Gmina Łopuszno, within Kielce County, Świętokrzyskie Voivodeship, in south-central Poland. It lies approximately 5 km (3 mi) west of Łopuszno and 31 km (19 mi) west of the regional capital Kielce.
