= Przegrody =

- Village
- Location within Poland
- Coordinates: 50°59′50″N 20°13′47″E
- Country: Poland
- Voivodeship: Świętokrzyskie
- County: Kielce
- Gmina: Łopuszno

Przegrody [pʂɛˈɡrɔdɨ] is a village in the administrative district of Gmina Łopuszno, within Kielce County, Świętokrzyskie Voivodeship, in south-central Poland. It lies approximately 6 km (4 mi) north of Łopuszno and 30 km (19 mi) north-west of the regional capital Kielce.
