= Kokosz, Greater Poland Voivodeship =

Kokosz
- Village
- Location within Poland
- Coordinates: 51°57′48″N 18°23′14″E
- Country: Poland
- Voivodeship: Greater Poland
- County: Turek
- Gmina: Malanów

Kokosz [ˈkɔkɔʂ] is a village in the administrative district of Gmina Malanów, within Turek County, Greater Poland Voivodeship, in west-central Poland.
