= Stanisława, Greater Poland Voivodeship =

Stanisława
- Village
- Location within Poland
- Coordinates: 51°53′17″N 18°25′19″E
- Country: Poland
- Voivodeship: Greater Poland
- County: Turek
- Gmina: Kawęczyn

Stanisława [staniˈswava] is a village in the administrative district of Gmina Kawęczyn, within Turek County, Greater Poland Voivodeship, in west-central Poland.
