= Budy Słodkowskie =

- Village
- Location within Poland
- Coordinates: 52°0′N 18°25′E
- Country: Poland
- Voivodeship: Greater Poland
- County: Turek
- Gmina: Turek
- Population: 279

Budy Słodkowskie [ˈbudɨ swɔtˈkɔfskʲɛ] is a village in the administrative district of Gmina Turek, within Turek County, Greater Poland Voivodeship, in west-central Poland.
