= Dąbrowa, Gmina Dobra =

Dąbrowa
- Village
- Location within Poland
- Coordinates: 52°04′N 18°42′E
- Country: Poland
- Voivodeship: Greater Poland
- County: Turek
- Gmina: Dobra
- Elevation: 94 m (308 ft)
- Population: 121

Dąbrowa [dɔmˈbrɔva] is a village in the administrative district of Gmina Dobra, within Turek County, Greater Poland Voivodeship, in west-central Poland.
