= Stefanów, Turek County =

Stefanów
- Village
- Location within Poland
- Coordinates: 52°0′N 18°33′E
- Country: Poland
- Voivodeship: Greater Poland
- County: Turek
- Gmina: Dobra
- Time zone: UTC+1 (CET)
  - Summer (DST): UTC+2 (CEST)

Stefanów [stɛˈfanuf] is a village in the administrative district of Gmina Dobra, within Turek County, Greater Poland Voivodeship, in central Poland.
