= Dziadowice =

- Village
- Location within Poland
- Coordinates: 51°59′N 18°21′E
- Country: Poland
- Voivodeship: Greater Poland
- County: Turek
- Gmina: Malanów
- Population: 494

Dziadowice [d͡ʑadɔˈvit͡sɛ] is a village in the administrative district of Gmina Malanów, within Turek County, Greater Poland Voivodeship, in west-central Poland.
