= Gnieździska =

- Village
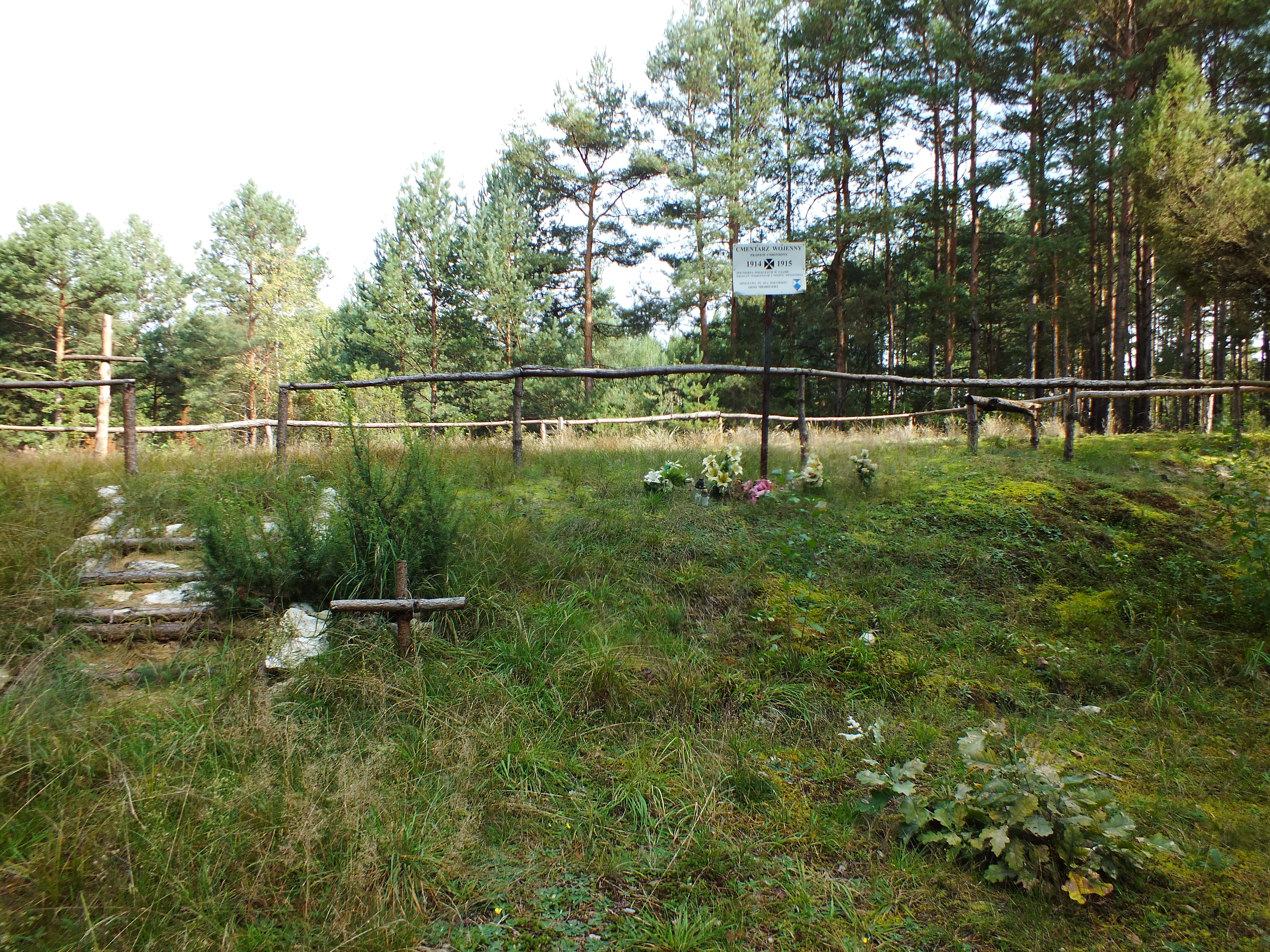
- War cemetery

- Location within Poland
- Coordinates: 50°52′6″N 20°16′56″E
- Country: Poland
- Voivodeship: Świętokrzyskie
- County: Kielce
- Gmina: Łopuszno
- Population: 797

Gnieździska [ɡɲɛʑˈd͡ʑiska] is a village in the administrative district of Gmina Łopuszno, within Kielce County, Świętokrzyskie Voivodeship, in south-central Poland. It lies approximately 10 km (6 mi) south of Łopuszno and 24 km (15 mi) west of the regional capital Kielce.
