= Szadowskie Góry =

- Village
- Location within Poland
- Coordinates: 52°3′39″N 18°31′43″E
- Country: Poland
- Voivodeship: Greater Poland
- County: Turek
- Gmina: Turek

Szadowskie Góry [ʂaˈdɔfskʲɛ ˈɡurɨ] is a village in the administrative district of Gmina Turek, within Turek County, Greater Poland Voivodeship, in west-central Poland.
