= Marcjanów, Turek County =

Marcjanów
- Village
- Location within Poland
- Coordinates: 51°53′N 18°28′E
- Country: Poland
- Voivodeship: Greater Poland
- County: Turek
- Gmina: Kawęczyn
- Time zone: UTC+1 (CET)
  - Summer (DST): UTC+2 (CEST)
- Vehicle registration: PTU

Marcjanów [mart͡sˈjanuf] is a village in the administrative district of Gmina Kawęczyn, within Turek County, Greater Poland Voivodeship, in central Poland.

Two Polish citizens were murdered by Nazi Germany in the village during World War II.
