= Skarżyn, Greater Poland Voivodeship =

Skarżyn
- Village
- Location within Poland
- Coordinates: 51°53′N 18°26′E
- Country: Poland
- Voivodeship: Greater Poland
- County: Turek
- Gmina: Kawęczyn

Skarżyn [ˈskarʐɨn] is a village in the administrative district of Gmina Kawęczyn, within Turek County, Greater Poland Voivodeship, in west-central Poland.
