= Lasocin, Kielce County =

Lasocin
- Village
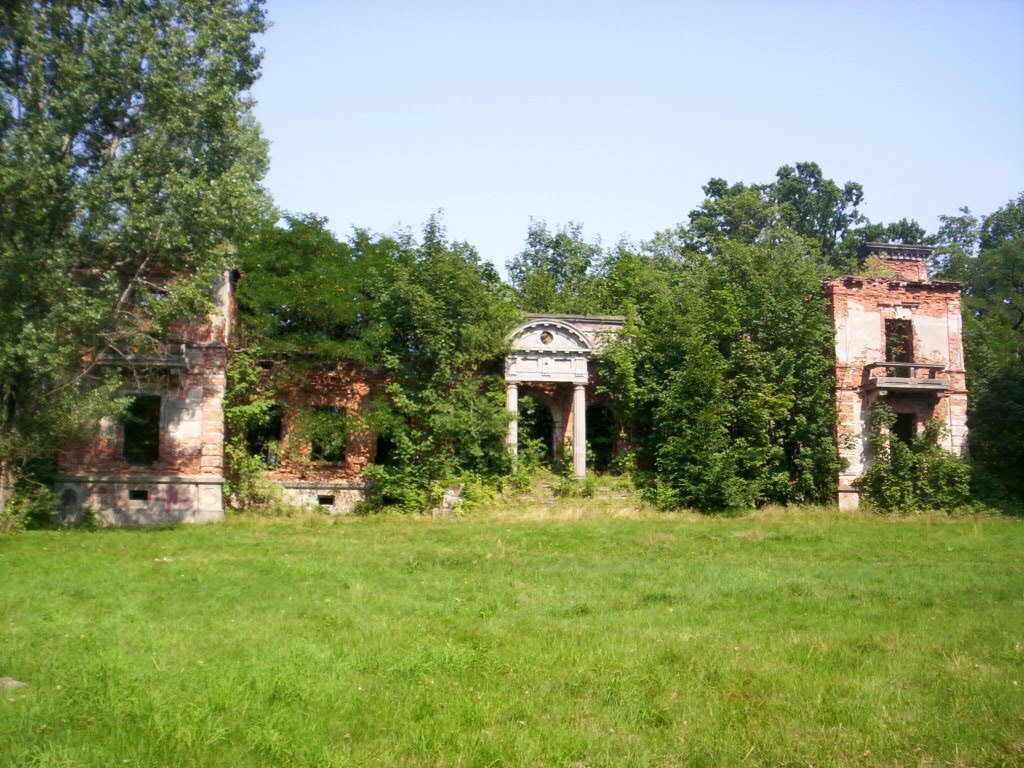
- Palace

- Location within Poland
- Coordinates: 50°58′17″N 20°8′34″E
- Country: Poland
- Voivodeship: Świętokrzyskie
- County: Kielce
- Gmina: Łopuszno
- Population: 374

Lasocin [laˈsɔt͡ɕin] is a village in the administrative district of Gmina Łopuszno, within Kielce County, Świętokrzyskie Voivodeship, in south-central Poland. It lies approximately 8 km (5 mi) west of Łopuszno and 35 km (22 mi) west of the regional capital Kielce.
