= Fanisławiczki =

- Village
- Location within Poland
- Coordinates: 50°53′1″N 20°18′52″E
- Country: Poland
- Voivodeship: Świętokrzyskie
- County: Kielce
- Gmina: Łopuszno
- Population: 147

Fanisławiczki [faniswaˈvit͡ʂki] is a village in the administrative district of Gmina Łopuszno, within Kielce County, Świętokrzyskie Voivodeship, in south-central Poland. It lies approximately 9 km (6 mi) south-east of Łopuszno and 22 km (14 mi) west of the regional capital Kielce.
