= Okręglica, Greater Poland Voivodeship =

Okręglica
- Village
- Location within Poland
- Coordinates: 51°52′N 18°32′E
- Country: Poland
- Voivodeship: Greater Poland
- County: Turek
- Gmina: Kawęczyn
- Time zone: UTC+1 (CET)
  - Summer (DST): UTC+2 (CEST)

Okręglica [ɔkrɛnˈɡlit͡sa] is a village in the administrative district of Gmina Kawęczyn, within Turek County, Greater Poland Voivodeship, in central Poland.
