= Czyste (disambiguation) =

Czyste is part of the Wola district of Warsaw.

Czyste may also refer to the following villages:

- Czyste, Kuyavian-Pomeranian Voivodeship (north-central Poland)
- Czyste, Masovian Voivodeship (east-central Poland)
- Czyste, Greater Poland Voivodeship (west-central Poland)
- Czyste, Lubusz Voivodeship (west Poland)
- Czyste, West Pomeranian Voivodeship (north-west Poland)
