= Trzymsze =

- Village
- Location within Poland
- Coordinates: 52°00′00″N 18°42′18″E
- Country: Poland
- Voivodeship: Greater Poland
- County: Turek
- Gmina: Przykona

Trzymsze [ˈtʂɨmʂɛ] is a village in the administrative district of Gmina Przykona, within Turek County, Greater Poland Voivodeship, in west-central Poland.
