= Strachocice =

- Village
- Location within Poland
- Coordinates: 51°51′N 18°39′E
- Country: Poland
- Voivodeship: Greater Poland
- County: Turek
- Gmina: Dobra

Strachocice [straxɔˈt͡ɕit͡sɛ] is a village in the administrative district of Gmina Dobra, within Turek County, Greater Poland Voivodeship, in west-central Poland.
