= Dziadowice-Folwark =

- Village
- Location within Poland
- Coordinates: 51°59′N 18°20′E
- Country: Poland
- Voivodeship: Greater Poland
- County: Turek
- Gmina: Malanów
- Population: 222

Dziadowice-Folwark [d͡ʑadɔˈvit͡sɛ ˈfɔlvark] is a village in the administrative district of Gmina Malanów, within Turek County, Greater Poland Voivodeship, in west-central Poland.
