= Wichertów =

- Village
- Location within Poland
- Coordinates: 51°58′35″N 18°38′03″E
- Country: Poland
- Voivodeship: Greater Poland
- County: Turek
- Gmina: Przykona

Wichertów [viˈxɛrtuf] is a village in the administrative district of Gmina Przykona, within Turek County, Greater Poland Voivodeship, in west-central Poland.
