= Dąbrowica, Turek County =

Dąbrowica
- Village
- Location within Poland
- Coordinates: 51°57′N 18°41′E
- Country: Poland
- Voivodeship: Greater Poland
- County: Turek
- Gmina: Dobra

Dąbrowica [dɔmbrɔˈvit͡sa] is a village in the administrative district of Gmina Dobra, within Turek County, Greater Poland Voivodeship, in west-central Poland.
