= Stawki, Gmina Dobra =

Stawki
- Village
- Location within Poland
- Coordinates: 51°55′20″N 18°42′47″E
- Country: Poland
- Voivodeship: Greater Poland
- County: Turek
- Gmina: Dobra

Stawki [ˈstafki] is a village in the administrative district of Gmina Dobra, within Turek County, Greater Poland Voivodeship, in west-central Poland.
