= Huta Jabłonowa =

- Village
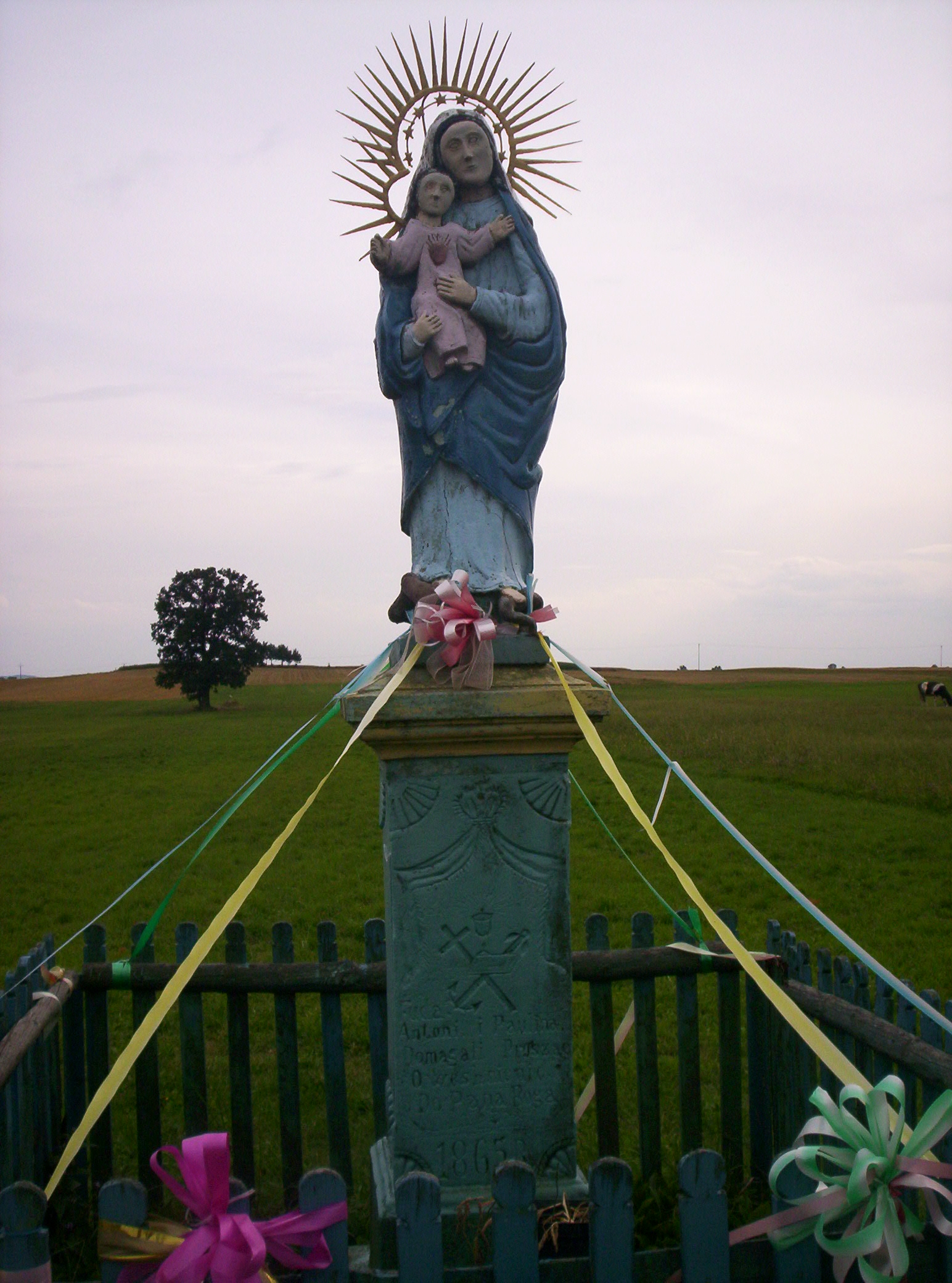
- Shrine

- Location within Poland
- Coordinates: 50°59′20″N 20°13′1″E
- Country: Poland
- Voivodeship: Świętokrzyskie
- County: Kielce
- Gmina: Łopuszno

Huta Jabłonowa [ˈxuta jabwɔˈnɔva] is a village in the administrative district of Gmina Łopuszno, within Kielce County, Świętokrzyskie Voivodeship, in south-central Poland. It lies approximately 6 km (4 mi) north-west of Łopuszno and 31 km (19 mi) north-west of the regional capital Kielce.
