= Chocim (disambiguation) =

Chocim is the Polish name for Khotyn, a city in Ukraine.

Chocim may also refer to the following villages in Poland:

- Chocim, Greater Poland Voivodeship (west-central Poland)
- Chocim, Opole Voivodeship (south-west Poland)
