= Dziewiątka, Greater Poland Voivodeship =

Dziewiątka
- Village
- Location within Poland
- Coordinates: 51°56′N 18°30′E
- Country: Poland
- Voivodeship: Greater Poland
- County: Turek
- Gmina: Kawęczyn

Dziewiątka [d͡ʑɛˈvjɔntka] is a village in the administrative district of Gmina Kawęczyn, within Turek County, Greater Poland Voivodeship, in west-central Poland.
