= Mikulice, Greater Poland Voivodeship =

Mikulice
- Village
- Location within Poland
- Coordinates: 51°56′N 18°35′E
- Country: Poland
- Voivodeship: Greater Poland
- County: Turek
- Gmina: Dobra
- Population: 390

Mikulice [mikuˈlit͡sɛ] is a village in the administrative district of Gmina Dobra, within Turek County, Greater Poland Voivodeship, in west-central Poland.
