= Stary Czachulec =

- Village
- Location within Poland
- Coordinates: 51°55′N 18°25′E
- Country: Poland
- Voivodeship: Greater Poland
- County: Turek
- Gmina: Malanów
- Population: 239
- Website: http://czachulec.yoyo.pl/

Stary Czachulec [ˈstarɨ t͡ʂaˈxulɛt͡s] is a village in the administrative district of Gmina Malanów, within Turek County, Greater Poland Voivodeship, in west-central Poland.
