= Chrapczew =

- Village
- Location within Poland
- Coordinates: 51°56′N 18°39′E
- Country: Poland
- Voivodeship: Greater Poland
- County: Turek
- Gmina: Dobra

Chrapczew [ˈxrapt͡ʂɛf] is a village in the administrative district of Gmina Dobra, within Turek County, Greater Poland Voivodeship, in west-central Poland.
