= Leśnictwo, Turek County =

Leśnictwo
- Village
- Location within Poland
- Coordinates: 51°56′33″N 18°29′40″E
- Country: Poland
- Voivodeship: Greater Poland
- County: Turek
- Gmina: Kawęczyn

Leśnictwo [lɛɕˈnit͡stfɔ] is a village in the administrative district of Gmina Kawęczyn, within Turek County, Greater Poland Voivodeship, in west-central Poland.
