= Krężołek =

- Village
- Location within Poland
- Coordinates: 50°58′49″N 20°13′52″E
- Country: Poland
- Voivodeship: Świętokrzyskie
- County: Kielce
- Gmina: Łopuszno
- Population: 127

Krężołek [krɛ̃ˈʐɔwɛk] is a village in the administrative district of Gmina Łopuszno, within Kielce County, Świętokrzyskie Voivodeship, in south-central Poland. It lies approximately 4 km (2 mi) north of Łopuszno and 30 km (19 mi) west of the regional capital Kielce.
