= Pęcherzew =

- Village
- Location within Poland
- Coordinates: 52°2′N 18°33′E
- Country: Poland
- Voivodeship: Greater Poland
- County: Turek
- Gmina: Turek
- Population: 170

Pęcherzew [pɛ̃ˈxɛʐɛf] is a village in the administrative district of Gmina Turek, within Turek County, Greater Poland Voivodeship, in west-central Poland.
