= Orczów =

- Village
- Location within Poland
- Coordinates: 50°55′52″N 20°17′19″E
- Country: Poland
- Voivodeship: Świętokrzyskie
- County: Kielce
- Gmina: Łopuszno

Orczów [ˈɔrt͡ʂuf] is a village in the administrative district of Gmina Łopuszno, within Kielce County, Świętokrzyskie Voivodeship, in south-central Poland. It lies approximately 4 km (2 mi) south-east of Łopuszno and 24 km (15 mi) west of the regional capital Kielce.
