= Poroże, Greater Poland Voivodeship =

Poroże
- Village
- Location within Poland
- Coordinates: 51°55′N 18°23′E
- Country: Poland
- Voivodeship: Greater Poland
- County: Turek
- Gmina: Malanów
- Population: 271

Poroże [pɔˈrɔʐɛ] is a village in the administrative district of Gmina Malanów, within Turek County, Greater Poland Voivodeship, in west-central Poland.
