= Marcinów, Greater Poland Voivodeship =

Marcinów
- Village
- Location within Poland
- Coordinates: 51°55′33″N 18°33′35″E
- Country: Poland
- Voivodeship: Greater Poland
- County: Turek
- Gmina: Kawęczyn
- Population: 160

Marcinów [marˈt͡ɕinuf] is a village in the administrative district of Gmina Kawęczyn, within Turek County, Greater Poland Voivodeship, in west-central Poland.

In 2005 the village had a population of 160.
