= Łęg Piekarski =

- Village
- Location within Poland
- Coordinates: 51°53′24″N 18°43′30″E
- Country: Poland
- Voivodeship: Greater Poland
- County: Turek
- Gmina: Dobra

Łęg Piekarski (pronounced [ˈwɛŋk pjɛˈkarskʲi]) is a village in the administrative district of Gmina Dobra, within Turek County, Greater Poland Voivodeship, in west-central Poland.
