= Młyniska (disambiguation) =

Młyniska is a district of the city of Gdańsk, Poland.

Młyniska may also refer to the following villages:

- Młyniska, Greater Poland Voivodeship (west-central Poland)
- Młyniska, Lublin Voivodeship (east Poland)
- Młyniska, Koszalin County in West Pomeranian Voivodeship (north-west Poland)
- Młyniska, Myślibórz County in West Pomeranian Voivodeship (north-west Poland)
