= Feliksów, Turek County =

Feliksów
- Village
- Location within Poland
- Coordinates: 51°57′N 18°22′E
- Country: Poland
- Voivodeship: Greater Poland
- County: Turek
- Gmina: Malanów
- Population: 399

Feliksów (Polish pronunciation: [fɛˈliksuf]) is a village in the administrative district of Gmina Malanów, within Turek County, Greater Poland Voivodeship, in west-central Poland.
