= Fanisławice =

- Village
- Location within Poland
- Coordinates: 50°53′24″N 20°19′0″E
- Country: Poland
- Voivodeship: Świętokrzyskie
- County: Kielce
- Gmina: Łopuszno
- Population: 402

Fanisławice [faniswaˈvit͡sɛ] is a village in the administrative district of Gmina Łopuszno, within Kielce County, Świętokrzyskie Voivodeship, in south-central Poland. It lies approximately 8 km (5 mi) south-east of Łopuszno and 22 km (14 mi) west of the regional capital Kielce.
