= Siedliska, Turek County =

Siedliska
- Village
- Location within Poland
- Coordinates: 51°57′N 18°30′E
- Country: Poland
- Voivodeship: Greater Poland
- County: Turek
- Gmina: Kawęczyn

Siedliska [ɕɛdˈlʲiska] is a village in the administrative district of Gmina Kawęczyn, within Turek County, Greater Poland Voivodeship, in west-central Poland.
