= Brody, Turek County =

Brody
- Village
- Location within Poland
- Coordinates: 51°58′N 18°19′E
- Country: Poland
- Voivodeship: Greater Poland
- County: Turek
- Gmina: Malanów
- Population: 60

Brody [ˈbrɔdɨ] is a village in the administrative district of Gmina Malanów, within Turek County, Greater Poland Voivodeship, in west-central Poland.
