= Smulsko =

- Village
- Location within Poland
- Coordinates: 51°58′26″N 18°30′21″E
- Country: Poland
- Voivodeship: Greater Poland
- County: Turek
- Gmina: Przykona

Smulsko [ˈsmulskɔ] is a village in the administrative district of Gmina Przykona, within Turek County, Greater Poland Voivodeship, in west-central Poland.

== History ==
Smulsko was mentioned among other Polish towns in 1136 in the so-called Bull of Gniezno, one of the most valuable monuments of Polish historiography. Near the town, among meadows, lies an early medieval ring-shaped hillfort, commonly known as Smulska Górka . The hillfort's circumference, measured at the summit, is approximately 250 meters, and its preserved height is 6 meters.
