= Kowale Pańskie-Kolonia =

- Village
- Location within Poland
- Coordinates: 51°56′0″N 18°32′0″E
- Country: Poland
- Voivodeship: Greater Poland
- County: Turek
- Gmina: Kawęczyn

Kowale Pańskie-Kolonia (Polish pronunciation: [kɔˈvalɛ ˈpaj̃skʲɛ kɔˈlɔɲa]) is a village in the administrative district of Gmina Kawęczyn, within Turek County, Greater Poland Voivodeship, in west-central Poland.
