= Gmina Malanów =

Gmina Malanów Malanów Commune
- Gmina
- Coat of arms

- Coordinates (Malanów): 51°57′9″N 18°23′28″E
- Country: Poland
- Voivodeship: Greater Poland
- County: Turek
- Seat: Malanów

Area
  - Total: 107.17 km^{2} (41.38 sq mi)

Population (2006)
  - Total: 6,451
  - Density: 60.19/km^{2} (155.9/sq mi)
- Time zone: UTC+1 (CET)
  - Summer (DST): UTC+2 (CEST)
- Vehicle registration: PTU
- Website: http://www.malanow.pl

Gmina Malanów is a rural gmina (administrative district) in Turek County, Greater Poland Voivodeship, in central Poland. Its seat is the village of Malanów, which lies approximately 11 kilometres (7 mi) south-west of Turek and 113 km (70 mi) south-east of the regional capital Poznań.

The gmina covers an area of 107.17 square kilometres (41.4 sq mi), and as of 2006 its total population is 6,451. Malanów is a rural area, characterized by significant forestation (covering about 25% of the gmina's territory).

Villages and settlements in the gmina include Bibianna, Brody, Celestyny, Dziadowice, Dziadowice-Folwark, Feliksów, Franulew, Grąbków, Kokosz, Kolnica, Kotwasice, Marysin, Miłaczew, Miłaczew Kolonia, Miłaczewek, Miłaczewskie Młyny, Niedźwiady, Obrydy, Paździerowice, Popielarze, Poroże, Rachowa, Skarżyn-Kolonia, Stary Czachulec, Targówka, Żdżenice and Zygmuntówek. These are organized into the 17 sołectwos of Bibianna, Celestyny, Dziadowice, Dziadowice-Folwark, Feliksów, Grąbków, Kotwasice, Malanów, Miłaczew, Miłaczen, Kolonia, Miłaczewek, Poroże, Rachowa, Skarżyn Kolonia, Stary Czachulec, Targówka and Żdżenice.

== Malanów commune emblem ==
The concept of the project was for the emblem to contain elements indispensably connected with this region. In the center of the emblem there is an oak which and is the symbol of the commune. The emblem also contains a church bell and a bishop's cross. All these elements are in gold, what symbolized fertility and rural character of the region. The emblem exists in its present form since 1999.

== Neighbouring gminas ==
Gmina Malanów is bordered by the gminas of Ceków-Kolonia, Kawęczyn, Mycielin, Tuliszków and Turek.
