= Gmina Przykona =

Gmina Przykona Przykona Commune
- Gmina
- Flag Coat of arms

- Coordinates (Przykona): 51°59′N 18°37′E
- Country: Poland
- Voivodeship: Greater Poland
- County: Turek
- Seat: Przykona

Area
  - Total: 110.93 km^{2} (42.83 sq mi)

Population (2006)
  - Total: 4,173
  - Density: 37.62/km^{2} (97.43/sq mi)
- Time zone: UTC+1 (CET)
  - Summer (DST): UTC+2 (CEST)
- Vehicle registration: PTU
- Website: http://www.przykona.pl/

Gmina Przykona is a rural gmina (administrative district) in Turek County, Greater Poland Voivodeship, in central Poland. Its seat is the village of Przykona, which lies approximately 9 kilometres (6 mi) south-east of Turek and 125 km (78 mi) east of the regional capital Poznań.

The gmina covers an area of 110.93 square kilometres (42.8 sq mi), and as of 2006 its total population is 4,173.

== Villages ==
Gmina Przykona contains the villages and settlements of Aleksandrów, Bądków Drugi, Bądków Pierwszy, Boleszczyn, Dąbrowa, Ewinów, Gąsin, Jakubka, Jeziorko, Józefina, Kaczki Plastowe, Laski, Młyniska, Olszówka, Paulinów, Posoka, Przykona, Psary, Radyczyny, Radyczyny-Kolonia, Rogów, Sarbice, Słomów Kościelny, Smulsko, Trzymsze, Wichertów, Żeroniczki and Zimotki.

== Neighbouring gminas ==
Gmina Przykona is bordered by the gminas of Brudzew, Dobra, Kawęczyn, Turek and Uniejów.
