= Olszówka, Świętokrzyskie Voivodeship =

Olszówka
- Village
- Location within Poland
- Coordinates: 50°58′38″N 20°16′42″E
- Country: Poland
- Voivodeship: Świętokrzyskie
- County: Kielce
- Gmina: Łopuszno
- Population: 96

Olszówka [ɔlˈʂufka] is a village in the administrative district of Gmina Łopuszno, within Kielce County, Świętokrzyskie Voivodeship, in south-central Poland. It lies approximately 4 km (2 mi) north-east of Łopuszno and 26 km (16 mi) north-west of the regional capital Kielce.
