= Nowy Świat, Gmina Kawęczyn =

Nowy Świat
- Village
- Location within Poland
- Coordinates: 51°53′59″N 18°29′20″E
- Country: Poland
- Voivodeship: Greater Poland
- County: Turek
- Gmina: Kawęczyn

Nowy Świat (Polish: [ˈnɔvɨ ˈɕfjat]; meaning "New World") is a village in the administrative district of Gmina Kawęczyn, within Turek County, Greater Poland Voivodeship, in the west-central area of Poland.
