= Nowy Czachulec =

- Village
- Location within Poland
- Coordinates: 51°54′55″N 18°27′42″E
- Country: Poland
- Voivodeship: Greater Poland
- County: Turek
- Gmina: Kawęczyn

Nowy Czachulec [ˈnɔvɨ t͡ʂaˈxulɛt͡s] is a village in the administrative district of Gmina Kawęczyn, within Turek County, Greater Poland Voivodeship, in west-central Poland.
