= Kawęczyn, Turek County =

Kawęczyn
- Village
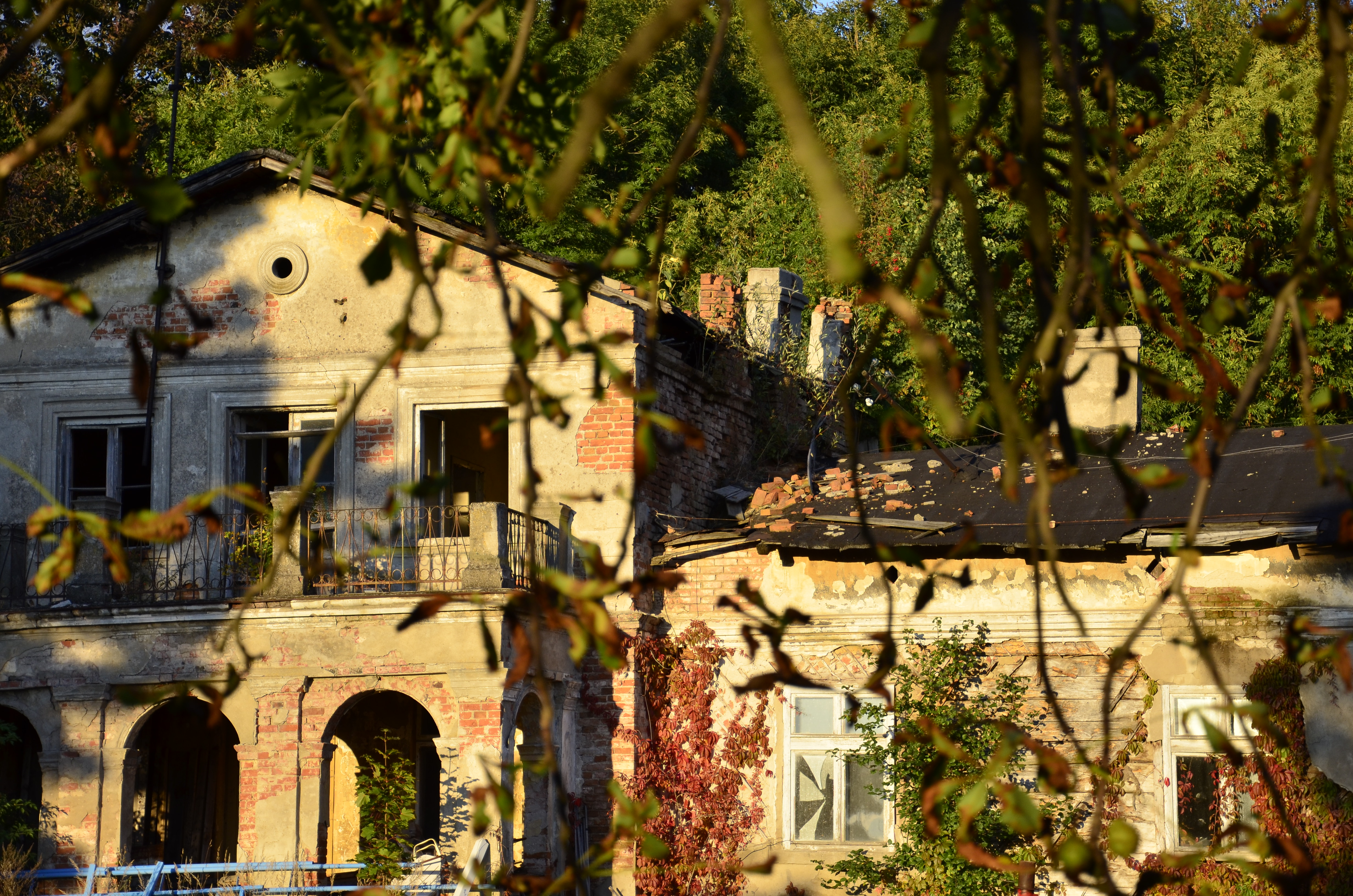
- Old manor in Kawęczyn

- Location within Poland
- Coordinates: 51°54′N 18°31′E
- Country: Poland
- Voivodeship: Greater Poland
- County: Turek
- Gmina: Kawęczyn
- Time zone: UTC+1 (CET)
  - Summer (DST): UTC+2 (CEST)
- Vehicle registration: PTU

Kawęczyn [kaˈvɛnt͡ʂɨn] is a village in Turek County, Greater Poland Voivodeship, in central Poland. It is the seat of the gmina (administrative district) called Gmina Kawęczyn.
