= Turkowice, Greater Poland Voivodeship =

Turkowice
- Village
- Location within Poland
- Coordinates: 51°59′N 18°30′E
- Country: Poland
- Voivodeship: Greater Poland
- County: Turek
- Gmina: Turek
- Population: 776

Turkowice [turkɔˈvit͡sɛ] is a village in the administrative district of Gmina Turek, within Turek County, Greater Poland Voivodeship, in west-central Poland.
