= Przykona =

- Village
- Old house in Przykona in 1974

- Location within Poland
- Coordinates: 51°59′N 18°37′E
- Country: Poland
- Voivodeship: Greater Poland
- County: Turek
- Gmina: Przykona

Population
  - Total: 520
- Time zone: UTC+1 (CET)
  - Summer (DST): UTC+2 (CEST)
- Vehicle registration: PTU

Przykona [pʂɨˈkɔna] is a village in Turek County, Greater Poland Voivodeship, in central Poland. It is the seat of the gmina (administrative district) called Gmina Przykona.
