= Młodzianów, Greater Poland Voivodeship =

Młodzianów
- Village
- Location within Poland
- Coordinates: 51°55′09″N 18°28′39″E
- Country: Poland
- Voivodeship: Greater Poland
- County: Turek
- Gmina: Kawęczyn

Młodzianów [mwɔˈd͡ʑanuf] is a village in the administrative district of Gmina Kawęczyn, within Turek County, Greater Poland Voivodeship, in west-central Poland.
