= Ugory, Greater Poland Voivodeship =

Ugory
- Village
- Location within Poland
- Coordinates: 51°56′35″N 18°38′15″E
- Country: Poland
- Voivodeship: Greater Poland
- County: Turek
- Gmina: Dobra

Ugory [uˈɡɔrɨ] is a village in the administrative district of Gmina Dobra, within Turek County, Greater Poland Voivodeship, in west-central Poland.
