= Grąbków =

- Village
- Location within Poland
- Coordinates: 51°57′N 18°25′E
- Country: Poland
- Voivodeship: Greater Poland
- County: Turek
- Gmina: Malanów

Population
  - Total: 586
- Time zone: UTC+1 (CET)
  - Summer (DST): UTC+2 (CEST)
- Vehicle registration: PTU

Grąbków [ˈɡrɔmpkuf] is a village in the administrative district of Gmina Malanów, within Turek County, Greater Poland Voivodeship, in central Poland.

Two Polish citizens were murdered by Nazi Germany in the village during World War II.
