= Gmina Dobra, Greater Poland Voivodeship =

Gmina Dobra Dobra Commune
- Gmina
- Coat of arms

- Coordinates (Dobra): 51°54′N 18°36′E
- Country: Poland
- Voivodeship: Greater Poland
- County: Turek
- Seat: Dobra

Area
  - Total: 131.79 km^{2} (50.88 sq mi)

Population (2006)
  - Total: 6,368
  - Density: 48.32/km^{2} (125.1/sq mi)
  - Urban: 1,511
  - Rural: 4,857
- Time zone: UTC+1 (CET)
  - Summer (DST): UTC+2 (CEST)
- Vehicle registration: PTU
- Website: http://dobra24.pl/

Gmina Dobra is an urban-rural gmina (administrative district) in Turek County, Greater Poland Voivodeship, in central Poland. Its seat is the town of Dobra, which lies approximately 15 kilometres (9 mi) south-east of Turek and 128 km (80 mi) south-east of the regional capital Poznań.

The gmina covers an area of 131.79 square kilometres (50.9 sq mi), and as of 2006 its total population is 6,368 (out of which the population of Dobra amounts to 1,511, and the population of the rural part of the gmina is 4,857).

== Villages ==
Apart from the town of Dobra, Gmina Dobra contains the villages and settlements of Chrapczew, Czajków, Czyste, Dąbrowa, Dąbrowica, Długa Wieś, Januszówka, Józefów, Kościanki, Łęg Piekarski, Linne, Mikulice, Miłkowice, Młyny Piekarskie, Moczydła, Ostrówek, Piekary, Potworów, Rzechta, Rzymsko, Rzymsko BG, Skęczniew, Stawki, Stefanów, Strachocice, Strachocice-Kolonia, Szymany, Ugory, Wola Piekarska, Zagaj, Zborów and Żeronice.

== Neighbouring gminas ==
Gmina Dobra is bordered by the gminas of Goszczanów, Kawęczyn, Pęczniew, Poddębice, Przykona, Turek, Uniejów and Warta.
