= Chocim, Greater Poland Voivodeship =

Chocim
- Village
- Location within Poland
- Coordinates: 51°51′N 18°32′E
- Country: Poland
- Voivodeship: Greater Poland
- County: Turek
- Gmina: Kawęczyn

Chocim [ˈxɔt͡ɕim] is a village in the administrative district of Gmina Kawęczyn, within Turek County, Greater Poland Voivodeship, in west-central Poland.
