= Gmina Kawęczyn =

Gmina Kawęczyn Kawęczyn Commune
- Gmina
- Coat of arms

- Coordinates (Kawęczyn): 51°54′9″N 18°31′50″E
- Country: Poland
- Voivodeship: Greater Poland
- County: Turek
- Seat: Kawęczyn

Area
  - Total: 101.06 km^{2} (39.02 sq mi)

Population (2006)
  - Total: 5,304
  - Density: 52.48/km^{2} (135.9/sq mi)
- Time zone: UTC+1 (CET)
  - Summer (DST): UTC+2 (CEST)
- Vehicle registration: PTU
- Website: http://www.kaweczyn.pl/

Gmina Kawęczyn is a rural gmina (administrative district) in Turek County, Greater Poland Voivodeship, in central Poland. Its seat is the village of Kawęczyn, which lies approximately 13 kilometres (8 mi) south of Turek and 124 km (77 mi) south-east of the regional capital Poznań.

The gmina covers an area of 101.06 square kilometres (39.0 sq mi), and as of 2006 its total population is 5,304.

== Villages ==
Gmina Kawęczyn contains the villages and settlements of Będziechów, Chocim, Ciemień, Dzierzbotki, Dziewiątka, Głuchów, Kawęczyn, Kowale Pańskie, Kowale Pańskie-Kolonia, Leśnictwo, Marcinów, Marcjanów, Marianów, Marianów-Kolonia, Milejów, Młodzianów, Nowy Czachulec, Nowy Świat, Okręglica, Siedliska, Skarżyn, Stanisława, Tokary Drugie, Tokary Pierwsze, Wojciechów and Żdżary.

== Neighbouring gminas ==
Gmina Kawęczyn is bordered by the gminas of Ceków-Kolonia, Dobra, Goszczanów, Lisków, Malanów, Przykona and Turek.
