= Olszówka, Turek County =

Olszówka
- Village
- Location within Poland
- Coordinates: 51°59′N 18°35′E
- Country: Poland
- Voivodeship: Greater Poland
- County: Turek
- Gmina: Przykona

Olszówka [ɔlˈʂufka] is a village in the administrative district of Gmina Przykona, within Turek County, Greater Poland Voivodeship, in west-central Poland.
