= Czyste, Greater Poland Voivodeship =

Czyste
- Village
- Location within Poland
- Coordinates: 51°54′41″N 18°40′08″E
- Country: Poland
- Voivodeship: Greater Poland
- County: Turek
- Gmina: Dobra

Czyste [ˈt͡ʂɨstɛ] is a village in the administrative district of Gmina Dobra, within Turek County, Greater Poland Voivodeship, in west-central Poland.
