= Gmina Łopuszno =

Gmina Łopuszno Łopuszno Commune
- Gmina
- Coat of arms
- Interactive map of Gmina Łopuszno
- Coordinates (Łopuszno): 50°56′55″N 20°15′3″E
- Country: Poland
- Voivodeship: Świętokrzyskie
- County: Kielce County
- Seat: Łopuszno

Area
  - Total: 176.81 km^{2} (68.27 sq mi)

Population (2006)
  - Total: 8,996
  - Density: 50.88/km^{2} (131.8/sq mi)
- Website: http://www.lopuszno.com.pl/

Gmina Łopuszno is a rural gmina (administrative district) in Kielce County, Świętokrzyskie Voivodeship, in south-central Poland. Its seat is the village of Łopuszno, which lies approximately 27 kilometres (17 mi) west of the regional capital Kielce.

The gmina covers an area of 176.81 square kilometres (68.3 sq mi). In 2006, its total population was 8,996.

The gmina contains part of the protected area called Przedbórz Landscape Park.

== Villages ==
Gmina Łopuszno contains the villages and settlements of Antonielów, Czałczyn, Czartoszowy, Dobrzeszów, Eustachów, Ewelinów, Fanisławice, Fanisławiczki, Gnieździska, Grabownica, Huta Jabłonowa, Jasień, Jedle, Józefina, Krężołek, Lasocin, Łopuszno, Marianów, Nowek, Olszówka, Orczów, Piotrowiec, Podewsie, Przegrody, Ruda Zajączkowska, Rudniki, Sarbice Drugie, Sarbice Pierwsze, Snochowice and Wielebnów.

== Neighbouring gminas ==
Gmina Łopuszno is bordered by the gminas of Krasocin, Małogoszcz, Mniów, Piekoszów, Radoszyce, Słupia and Strawczyn.
