= Miłkowice, Greater Poland Voivodeship =

Miłkowice
- Village
- Saint Nicholas Church

- Location within Poland
- Coordinates: 51°50′N 18°40′E
- Country: Poland
- Voivodeship: Greater Poland
- County: Turek
- Gmina: Dobra

Population
  - Total: 200
- Time zone: UTC+1 (CET)
  - Summer (DST): UTC+2 (CEST)
- Vehicle registration: PTU

Miłkowice [miu̯kɔˈvit͡sɛ] is a village in the administrative district of Gmina Dobra, within Turek County, Greater Poland Voivodeship, in central Poland.

Two Polish citizens were murdered by Nazi Germany in the village during World War II.
