= Dobra, Turek County =

Dobra
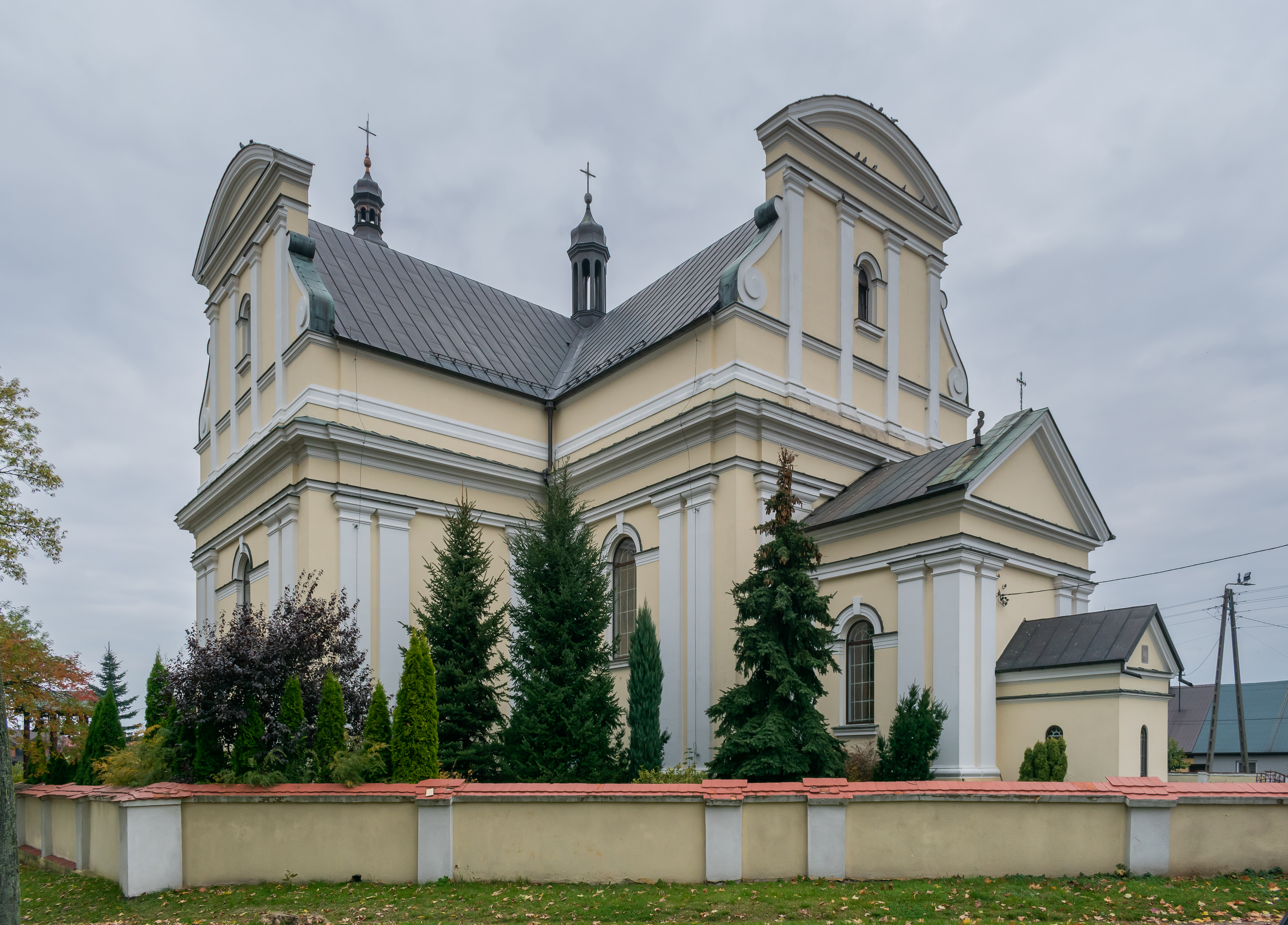
- Church of the Nativity of Virgin Mary

- Coat of arms

- Location within Poland
- Coordinates: 51°54′N 18°36′E
- Country: Poland
- Voivodeship: Greater Poland
- County: Turek
- Gmina: Dobra

Government
  - Mayor: Tadeusz Gebler

Area
  - Total: 1.84 km^{2} (0.71 sq mi)
- Elevation: 123 m (404 ft)

Population (31 December 2021)
  - Total: 1,333
  - Density: 724/km^{2} (1,880/sq mi)
- Time zone: UTC+1 (CET)
  - Summer (DST): UTC+2 (CEST)
- Postal code: 62-730
- Area code: +48 63
- Vehicle registration: PTU
- Website: http://www.dobra24.pl

Dobra [ˈdɔbra] is a town in Turek County, Greater Poland Voivodeship, in central Poland, with 1,333 inhabitants as of December 2021. It is located in the Sieradz Land.

== History ==
Dobra was a private town, administratively located in the Sieradz County in the Sieradz Voivodeship in the Greater Poland Province of the Kingdom of Poland.

From 1975 to 1998, it belonged to Konin Voivodeship.

== Transport ==
Dobra lies on national road 83. National road connects Dobra to Turek to the north and to Sieradz to the south.

The nearest railway station is in Koło.
