= Gmina Turek =

Gmina Turek Turek Commune
- Gmina
- Flag Coat of arms

- Coordinates (Turek): 52°1′N 18°30′E
- Country: Poland
- Voivodeship: Greater Poland
- County: Turek
- Seat: Turek

Area
  - Total: 109.42 km^{2} (42.25 sq mi)

Population (2006)
  - Total: 7,605
  - Density: 69.50/km^{2} (180.0/sq mi)
- Time zone: UTC+1 (CET)
  - Summer (DST): UTC+2 (CEST)
- Vehicle registration: PTU
- Website: http://www.gmina.turek.pl

Gmina Turek is a rural gmina (administrative district) in Turek County, Greater Poland Voivodeship, in central Poland. Its seat is the town of Turek, although the town is not part of the territory of the gmina.

The gmina covers an area of 109.42 square kilometres (42.2 sq mi), and as of 2006 its total population is 7,605.

== Massacre during Second World War ==
During the German Invasion of Poland in 1939, German soldiers conducted a massacre in the area. 24 Poles were mass murdered on 7 September 1939. The victims were mostly farmers and refugees and elderly people(up to 80 years old).

== Villages ==
Gmina Turek contains the villages and settlements of Albertów, Budy Słodkowskie, Chlebów, Cisew, Cisew Mały, Dzierżązna, Grabieniec, Kaczki Średnie, Kalinowa, Korytków, Kowale Księże, Obrębizna, Obrzębin, Pęcherzew, Słodków, Słodków-Kolonia, Szadów Księży, Szadów Pański, Szadowskie Góry, Turkowice, Warenka, Wietchinin, Wrząca and Żuki.

== Neighbouring gminas ==
Gmina Turek is bordered by the town of Turek and by the gminas of Brudzew, Dobra, Kawęczyn, Malanów, Przykona, Tuliszków and Władysławów.
