= Józefina, Gmina Przykona =

Józefina
- Village
- Location within Poland
- Coordinates: 52°1′N 18°38′E
- Country: Poland
- Voivodeship: Greater Poland
- County: Turek
- Gmina: Przykona

Józefina [juzɛˈfina] is a village in the administrative district of Gmina Przykona, within Turek County, Greater Poland Voivodeship, in west-central Poland.
