= Józefina, Świętokrzyskie Voivodeship =

Józefina
- Village
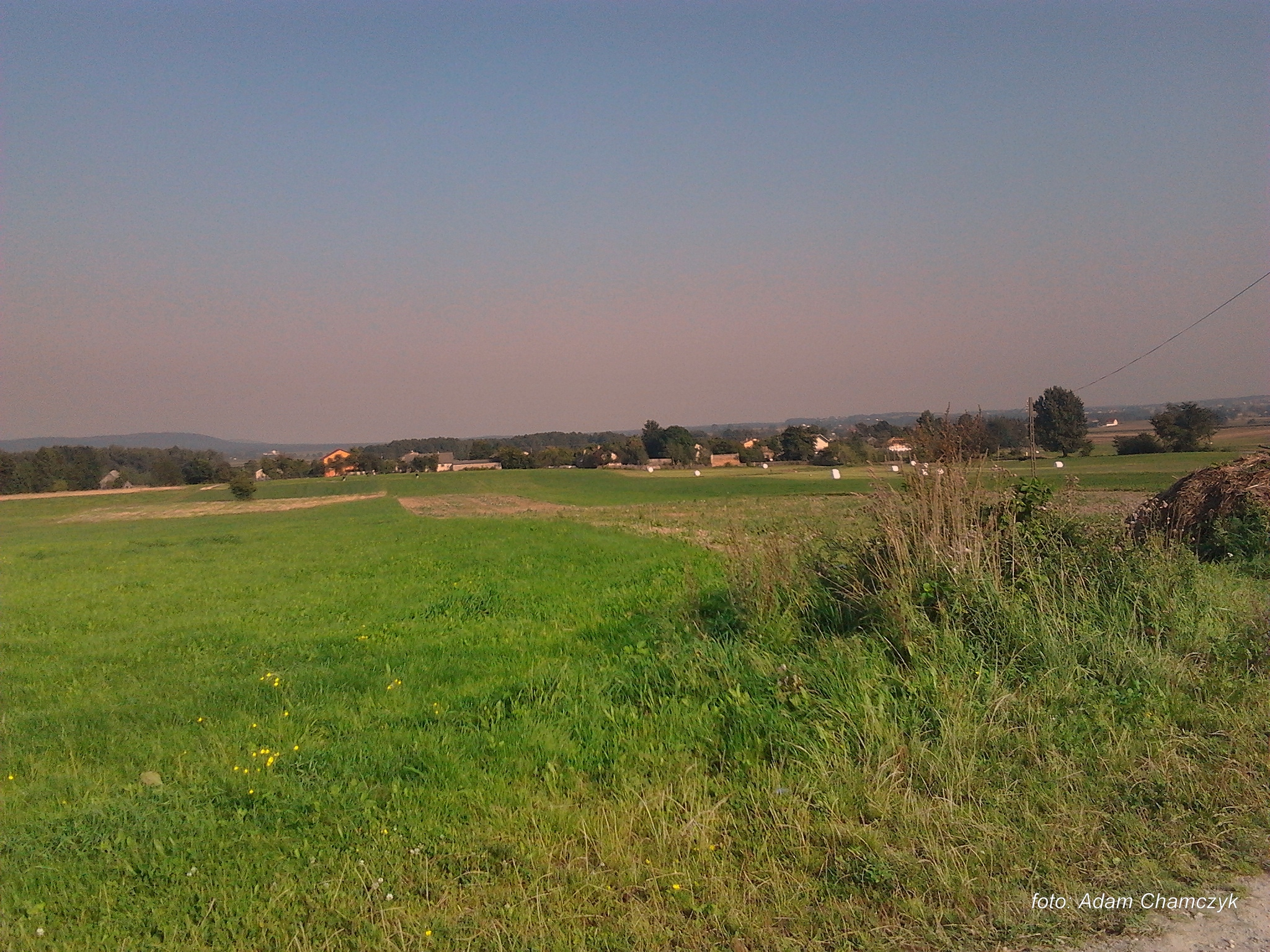

- Location within Poland
- Coordinates: 50°57′39″N 20°16′32″E
- Country: Poland
- Voivodeship: Świętokrzyskie
- County: Kielce
- Gmina: Łopuszno
- Population: 294

Józefina [juzɛˈfina] is a village in the administrative district of Gmina Łopuszno, within Kielce County, Świętokrzyskie Voivodeship, in south-central Poland. It lies approximately 3 km (2 mi) north-east of Łopuszno and 26 km (16 mi) west of the regional capital Kielce.
