= Malanów, Greater Poland Voivodeship =

Malanów
- Village
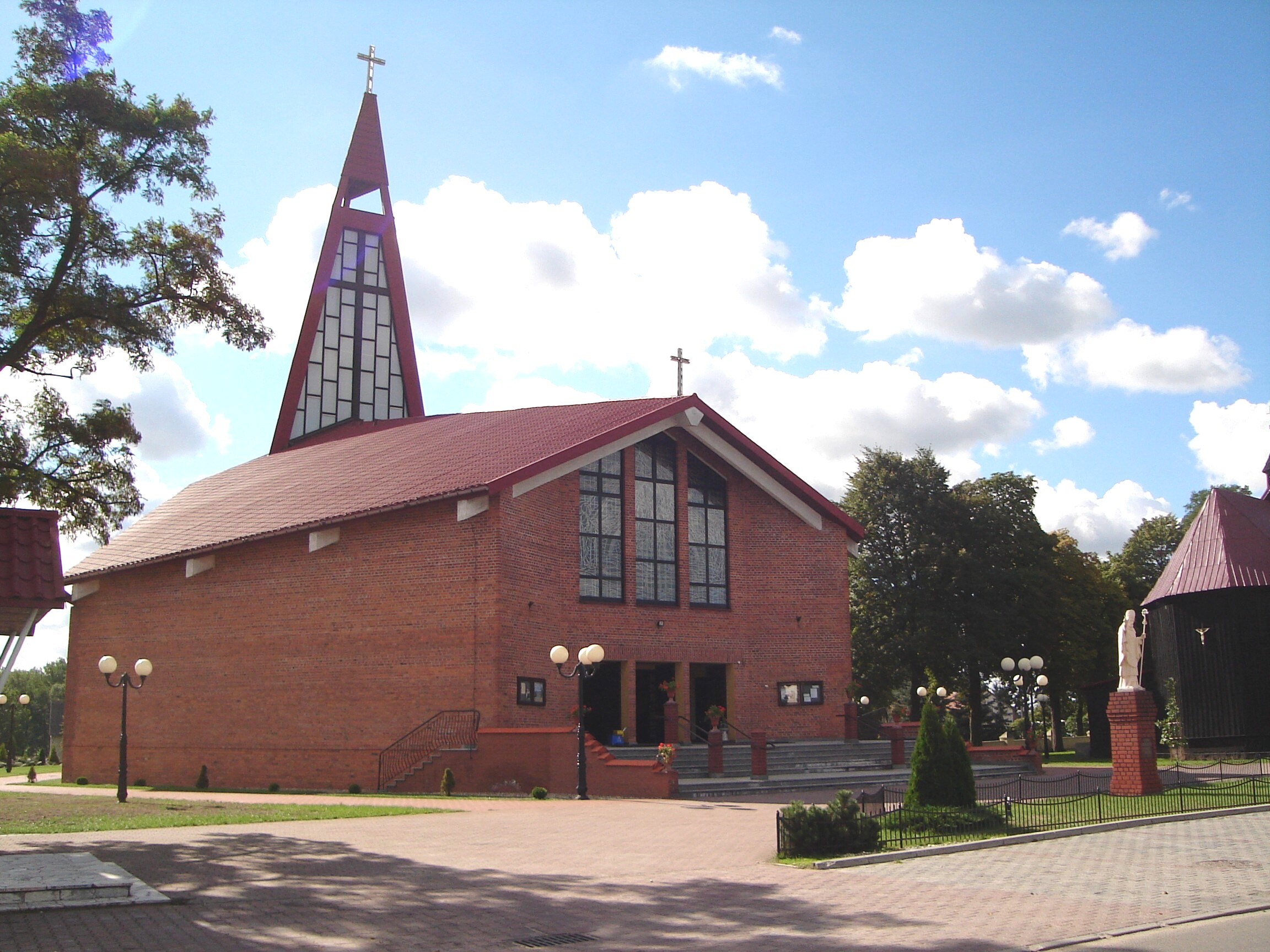
- Church of Saint Stanislaus

- Location within Poland
- Coordinates: 51°57′N 18°23′E
- Country: Poland
- Voivodeship: Greater Poland
- County: Turek
- Gmina: Malanów
- Elevation: 180 m (590 ft)

Population
  - Total: 1,607
- Website: https://www.malanow.pl/

Malanów [maˈlanuf] is a village in Turek County, Greater Poland Voivodeship, in west-central Poland. It is the seat of the gmina (administrative district) called Gmina Malanów.
