= Łopuszno =

- Town
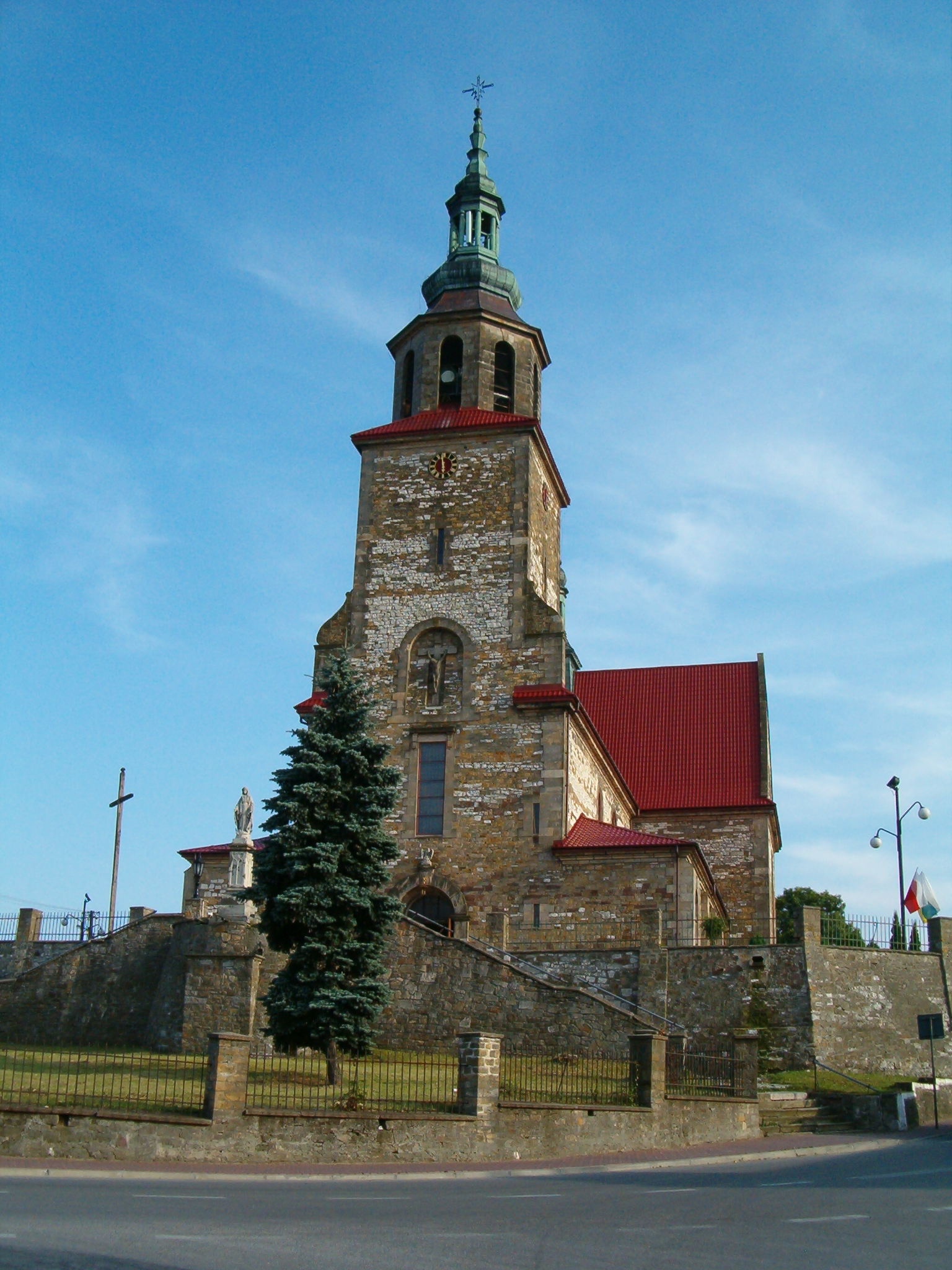
- Church of the Exaltation of the Holy Cross

- Coat of arms

- Location within Poland
- Coordinates: 50°56′55″N 20°15′3″E
- Country: Poland
- Voivodeship: Świętokrzyskie
- County: Kielce
- Gmina: Łopuszno

Population
  - Total: 1,279
- Time zone: UTC+1 (CET)
  - Summer (DST): UTC+2 (CEST)
- Postal code: 26-070
- Area code: +48 41
- Vehicle registration: TKI

Łopuszno [wɔˈpuʂnɔ] is a town in Kielce County, Świętokrzyskie Voivodeship, in south-central Poland. It is the seat of the gmina (administrative district) called Gmina Łopuszno. It lies approximately 27 km (17 mi) west of the regional capital Kielce.

== Transport ==
Łopuszko lies at the intersection of voivodeship roads 786 and 728.

The nearest railway station is in Małogoszcz.
