= Turek County =

Turek County Powiat turecki
- County
- Flag Coat of arms

- Location within the voivodeship

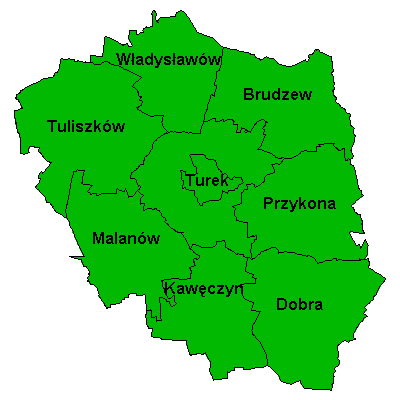
- Division into gminas
- Coordinates (Turek): 52°1′N 18°30′E
- Country: Poland
- Voivodeship: Greater Poland
- Seat: Turek
- Gminas: Total 9 (incl. 1 urban): Turek; Gmina Brudzew; Gmina Dobra; Gmina Kawęczyn; Gmina Malanów; Gmina Przykona; Gmina Tuliszków; Gmina Turek; Gmina Władysławów

Area
  - Total: 929.4 km^{2} (358.8 sq mi)

Population (2006)
  - Total: 83,635
  - Density: 89.99/km^{2} (233.1/sq mi)
  - Urban: 34,206
  - Rural: 49,429
- Time zone: UTC+1 (CET)
  - Summer (DST): UTC+2 (CEST)
- Vehicle registration: PTU
- Website: www.powiat.turek.pl

Turek County (Polish: powiat turecki) is a unit of territorial administration and local government (powiat) in Greater Poland Voivodeship, central Poland. It came into being on 1 January 1999 as a result of the Polish local government reforms passed in 1998. Its administrative seat and largest town is Turek, which lies 117 kilometres (73 mi) east of the regional capital Poznań. The county also contains the towns of Tuliszków, lying 16 km (10 mi) north-west of Turek, and Dobra, 15 km (9 mi) south-east of Turek.

The county covers an area of 929.4 square kilometres (358.8 sq mi). As of 2006 its total population is 83,635, out of which the population of Turek is 29,302, that of Tuliszków is 3,393, that of Dobra is 1,511, and the rural population is 49,429.

== Neighbouring counties ==
Turek County is bordered by Koło County to the north, Poddębice County to the east, Sieradz County to the south, Kalisz County to the south-west and Konin County to the north-west.

== Administrative divisions ==
The county is subdivided into nine gminas (one urban, two urban-rural and six rural). These are listed in the following table, in descending order of population.

Gmina	Type	Area (km²)	Population (2006)	Seat
Turek	urban	16.2	29,302	
Gmina Tuliszków	urban-rural	149.4	10,510	Tuliszków
Gmina Władysławów	rural	90.7	7,807	Władysławów
Gmina Turek	rural	109.4	7,605	Turek *
Gmina Malanów	rural	107.2	6,451	Malanów
Gmina Dobra	urban-rural	131.8	6,368	Dobra
Gmina Brudzew	rural	112.7	6,115	Brudzew
Gmina Kawęczyn	rural	101.1	5,304	Kawęczyn
Gmina Przykona	rural	110.9	4,173	Przykona
* seat not part of the gmina
