= List of ambassadors of Poland to Estonia =

Polish diplomatic relations

Poland Ambassador to Estonia
- Ambasador Rzeczypospolitej Polskiej w Estonii
- Coat of arms of Poland

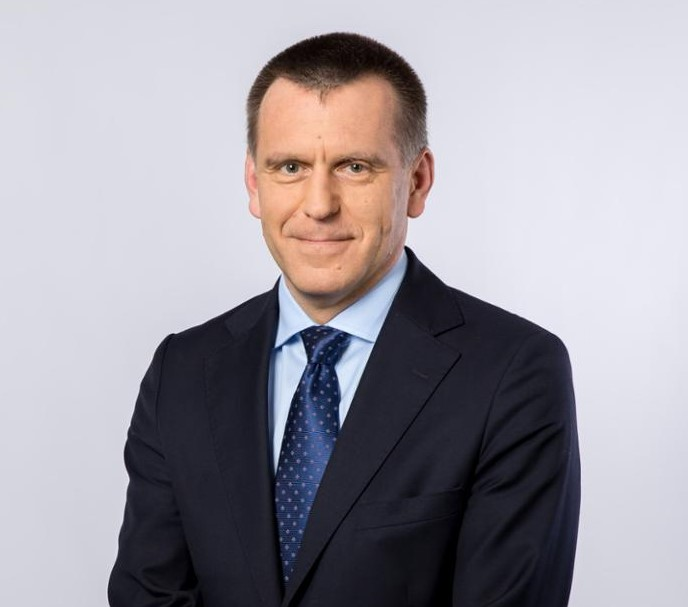
- Incumbent; Artur Orzechowski since October 2024
- Style: Mr. Ambassador (informal); His Excellency (diplomatic)
- Reports to: Polish Ministry of Foreign Affairs
- Seat: Tallinn, Estonia
- Appointer: President of Poland
- Term length: No fixed term
- Website: Polish Embassy, Estonia

The Polish ambassador to Estonia is the official representative of the president and the government of Poland to the president and the government of Estonia.

The ambassador and his staff work in the Polish embassy in Tallinn.

== History ==
Poland established diplomatic relations with Estonia on May 4, 1921, when representative of the Republic of Estonia delivered letter of credence to the Polish Ministry of Foreign Affairs.

On September 30, 1939, diplomatic relations between Poland and Estonia were dissolved because of the Soviet-German Molotov–Ribbentrop Pact, which expropriated among others Poland and Estonia. Between 1939 and 1991 there was no official relations between Polish People's Republic led by communists and Estonian SSR, which was a part of the Soviet Union. However, there were bilateral relations between Polish government-in-exile and Estonian government-in-exile.

In 1989 Poland extricated from the Iron Curtain, and in 1991 Estonia regained its independence. On September 2, 1991, diplomatic relations between countries were officially restored. In 1993 Poland opened embassy in Tallinn.

== List of ambassadors of Poland to Estonia ==
=== Second Polish Republic ===
- 1920–1921: Leon Wasilewski (envoy)
- 1921–1922: Michał Sokolnicki (envoy)
- 1922–1924: Wacław Tadeusz Dobrzyński (envoy)
- 1924–1928: Franciszek Charwat (envoy)
- 1928–1929: Józef Wołodkowicz (chargé d’affaires)
- 1929–1929: Kazimierz Papée (chargé d’affaires)
- 1929–1933: Konrad Libicki (envoy)
- 1933–1934: Jan Starzewski (chargé d’affaires)
- 1934–1939: Wacław Przesmycki (envoy)

=== Third Polish Republic ===
- 1991–1992: Jarosław Lindenberg (chargé d’affaires)
- 1992–1993: Jan Kostrzak (chargé d’affaires)
- 1993–1994: Jarosław Lindenberg
- 1994–2001: Jakub Wołąsiewicz
- 2001–2005: Wojciech z Wróblewski
- 2005–2010: Tomasz Chłoń
- 2010–2014: Grzegorz Marek Poznański
- 2014–2018: Robert Filipczak
- 2018–2023: Grzegorz Kozłowski
- since 2024: Artur Orzechowski (chargé d’affaires until April 2025)

== See also ==
- List of ambassadors of Poland to Finland
