= Strzałka =

Strzałka is a Polish surname. Notable people with the surname include:

- Jerzy Strzałka (1933–1976), Polish fencer
- Joanna Strzałka (born 1968), Polish chess master
- Krzysztof Strzałka (born 1967), Polish political scientist and diplomat
- Mariusz Strzałka (born 1959), Polish fencer
- Mieczysław Strzałka (born 1947), Polish gymnast
