= Cieplak =

Cieplak is a Polish language family name. Notable people with the surname include:

- Jan Cieplak (1857–1926) Polish archbishop
- Marian Cieplak (1893–1966), Polish diplomat and statesman
- Paweł Cieplak (born 1966), Polish diplomat
- Piotr Cieplak (1960–2025), Polish theatre director
- Ursula Cieplak, a protagonist of a Polish telenovela BrzydUla
