= Adam Hałaciński =

Polish diplomat (born 1962)

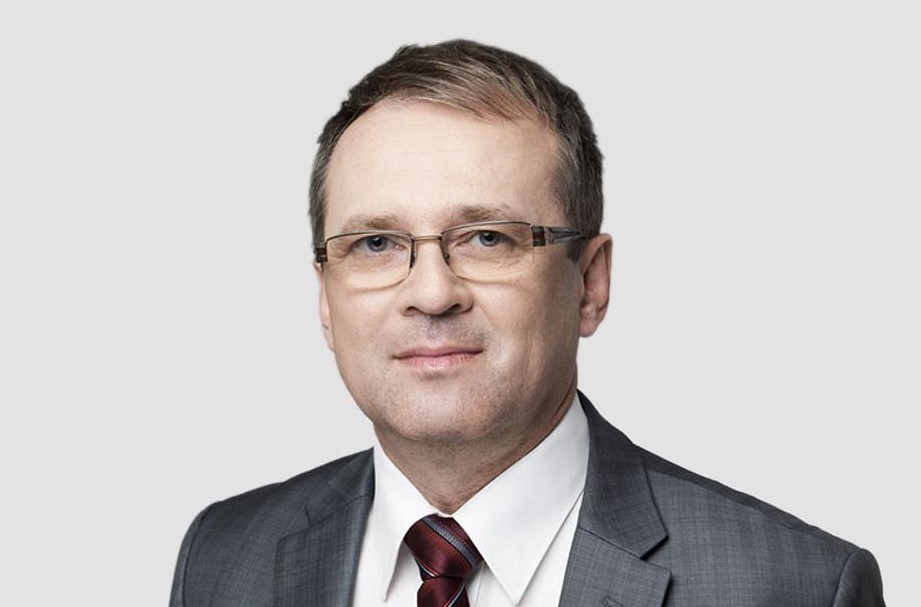

Poland Ambassador to Sweden
- In office 16 September 2010 – 2014
- Preceded by: Michał Czyż
- Succeeded by: Wiesław Tarka

Poland Ambassador to OSCE
- In office 20 January 2020 – July 2024
- Preceded by: Adam Bugajski
- Succeeded by: Marek Szczygieł

Personal details
- Born: June 4, 1962 (age 64) Warsaw
- Education: University of Warsaw
- Profession: Diplomat

Adam Norbert Hałaciński (born 4 June 1962, in Warsaw) is a Polish diplomat who was ambassador to Sweden from 2010 to 2014 and from 2020 to 2024 permanent representative to the Organization for Security and Co-operation in Europe.

== Biography ==
Hałaciński graduated in German studies at the University of Warsaw. He also studied at the Faculty of Journalism and Political Science, the Polish Institute of International Affairs, and the Diplomatic Academy of Vienna.

In 1989, he joined the Ministry of Foreign Affairs of Poland. Between 1993 and 1999 he was posted at the Permanent Representation to the OSCE in Vienna, including during the 1998 Polish Chairmanship. After the posting he worked at the Department of Central and Southern Europe and, as director, at the Department of Western Europe. Afterwards, he was deputy director of the Department of Europe responsible for cooperation with Western European countries, and established the International Visegrad Fund.

Following his work as deputy ambassador to Austria (2002–2007), he was deputy director of the Department of Europe, then head of the Department of Central and Southern Europe. From 2010 to 2014 Hałaciński served as ambassador to the Kingdom of Sweden. Between 2015 and 2016 he was the Minister's Plenipotentiary for the Preparation of the 2016 NATO Summit. From April 2017 he headed the Security Policy Department.

On 31 October 2019, he was appointed Permanent Representative to the OSCE. He took the post on 20 January 2020, and three days later presented the credentials to OSCE Secretary General Thomas Greminger. He ended his mission in July 2024. In November 2024, he was nominated Foreign Minister's Plenipotentiary for Cooperation with Belarusian Democratic Forces.

In 2022 he chaired Permanent Council Meetings during the Polish Chairpersonship of the OSCE.

Besides Polish, Hałaciński speaks English, German, and Swedish.

== Honours ==
- Knight's Cross of the Order of Polonia Restituta (2019)
