= Tomasz Chłoń =

Polish diplomat (born 1961)

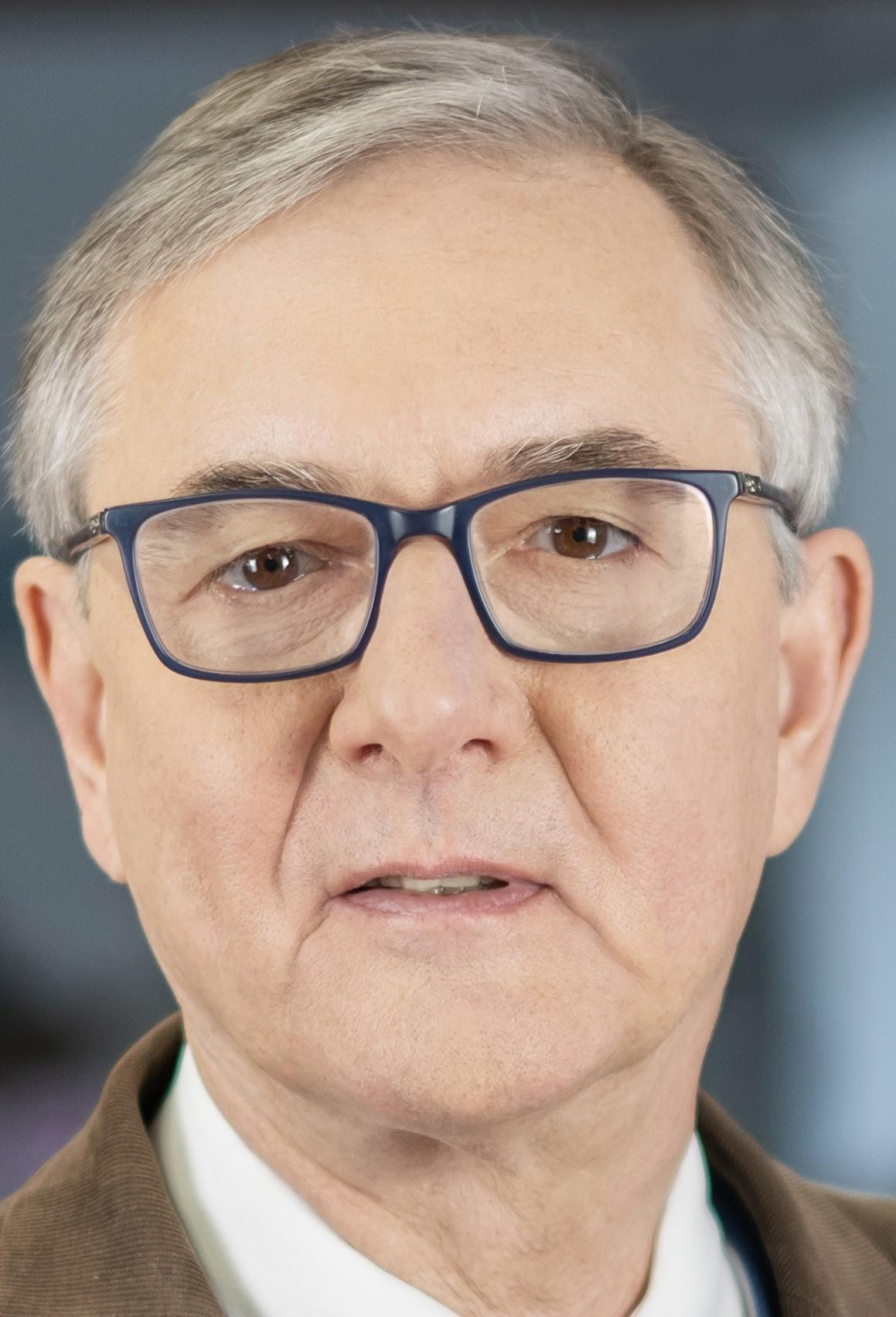
- Tomasz Chłoń (2024)

Poland Ambassador to Estonia
- In office 2005–2010
- Preceded by: Wojciech Wróblewski
- Succeeded by: Grzegorz Marek Poznański

Poland Ambassador to Slovakia
- In office 2013–2015
- Preceded by: Andrzej Krawczyk
- Succeeded by: Leszek Soczewica

Personal details
- Born: 29 October 1961 (age 64) Warsaw, Poland
- Education: University of Warsaw
- Profession: Diplomat

Tomasz Marek Chłoń (born 29 October 1961, in Warsaw) is a Polish diplomat, who served as, Ambassador to Estonia (2005–2010), Ambassador to Slovakia (2013–2015) and Chargé d'Affaires ad interim to Finland (2024–2026)

== Life ==
Chłoń graduated in Hungarian studies from the University of Warsaw (1987). He was educated also in political studies at the Polish Institute of International Affairs, and in European integration at the University of Warsaw and the Maastricht University.

In 1987, he started his diplomatic career at the Ministry of Foreign Affairs. Between 1991 and 1997, he was serving at the Embassy of Poland in Helsinki, since 1996 as deputy chief of mission. Next, he was head of unit at the MFA Security Policy Department. From 1998 to 2003, he was working at the Permanent Delegation of the Republic of Poland to NATO in Brussels being responsible for, among others, representing Poland in the Political Committee and negotiating the agreement establishing the NATO-Russia Council. Following his return to Warsaw, he was again head of unit at the MFA Security Policy Department and, since 2004, deputy director of the MFA United Nations System Department. Between 2005 and 2010, he served as ambassador to Estonia. Next, he was director of the Minister's Secretary. In January 2013, he was nominated ambassador to Slovakia. He ended his mission in April 2015. Until March 2016, he was in charge of organizing the Warsaw NATO summit which took place in July 2016. In 2017–2020, he was Director of the NATO Information Office in Moscow, heading it from Brussels. In April 2024, he became director of the MFA Public Diplomacy Department; after reorganization director of the MFA Department for Strategic Communications and Countering Foreign Disinformation. On 14 May 2024, he was also appointed Foreign Minister's plenipotentiary for countering international disinformation. Between December 2024 and 2026, he was heading the Embassy in Helsinki as Chargé d'affaires.

Besides his native Polish, he speaks English, Finnish, Hungarian, and has some knowledge of Estonian, French, and Russian.

Father to three daughters.

== Honours ==
- Order of the Cross of Terra Mariana, 1st class – Estonia, 2010
- Silver Cross of Merit – Poland, 2010
- Medal of the President of Slovak Republic – Slovakia, 2015
