= Jan Łopata =

Polish politician (born 1954)

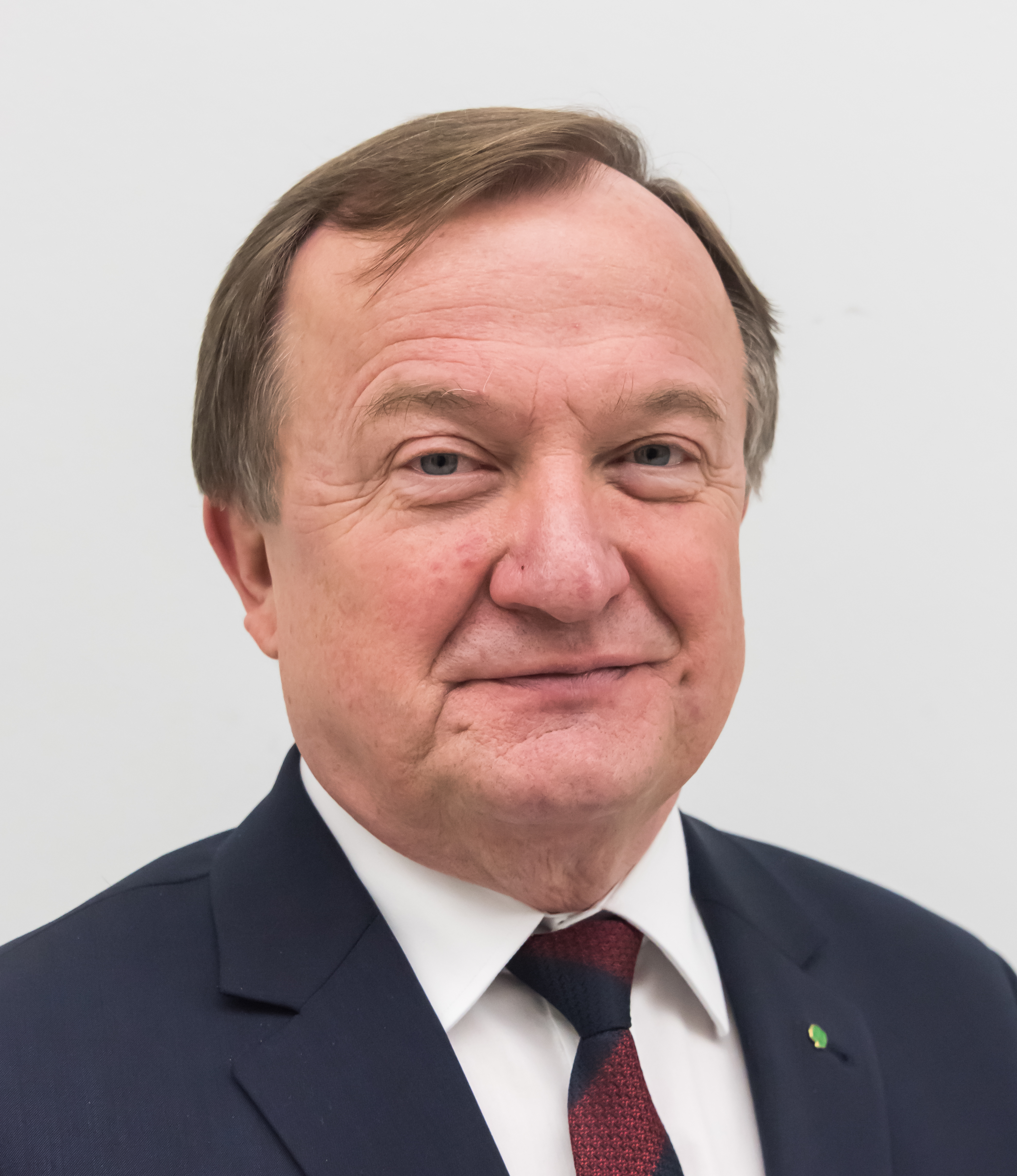

Member of the Sejm
- Incumbent
- Assumed office 25 September 2005
- Constituency: 6 – Lublin

Personal details
- Born: 16 August 1954 (age 71)
- Party: Polish People's Party

Jan Zbigniew Łopata (born 16 August 1954 in Motycz) is a Polish politician. He was elected to Sejm on 25 September 2005, getting 8033 votes in 6 Lublin district as a candidate from the Polish People's Party list.

== See also ==
- Members of Polish Sejm 2005-2007
