= Jarosław Suchoples =

Polish diplomat

Poland Ambassador to Finland
- In office 5 September 2017 – 31 March 2019
- Appointed by: Andrzej Duda
- President: Sauli Niinistö
- Preceded by: Przemysław Grudziński
- Succeeded by: Piotr Rychlik

Personal details
- Born: 12 April 1969 (age 57) Gdańsk
- Spouse: Katarzyna Stachura-Suchoples
- Children: 1
- Education: University of Gdańsk
- Profession: Historian, academic, diplomat
- Awards: Commander with Star of the Order of the White Rose of Finland (2017)

Jarosław Edward Suchoples (born 12 April 1969) is a Polish historian, translator, and diplomat, who served as Ambassador of Poland to Finland (2017–2019).

== Life ==
Jarosław Suchoples holds an M.A. in history from the University of Gdańsk. In 2000, he defended his Ph.D. thesis at the Department of History, University of Helsinki, with distinction. His doctoral advisor was Matti Klinge. He has also studied at the University of California, Berkeley (2001–2002).

Between 2000 and 2002 he worked as an analyst at the Polish Institute of International Affairs. He has been a lecturer at the Humboldt University of Berlin (2003–2004), Free University of Berlin (2003–2005), University of Wrocław (2003–2005), University of Warmia and Mazury in Olsztyn (2007–2008), and University of Szczecin (2008–2013). Between 2013 and 2015 he was associate professor of European Studies at the National University of Malaysia. From 5 September 2017 to 31 March 2019, Suchoples served as Ambassador of Poland to Finland. Subsequently, he was a researcher at the Institute of Music, Art and Culture Studies at the University of Jyväskylä (2019–2023), and has been a researcher at the European Centre of the University of Warsaw (since 2023).

He is the author and editor of scholarly publications on Finland, the Baltic Sea region, the history of World War I, World War II, the Cold War, and cultures of memory. He is also the translator of works by Finnish historian Matti Klinge into Polish.

Beside Polish, Suchoples speaks English, German, Russian, and Finnish. He is married to Katarzyna Stachura-Suchoples and has one daughter.

In 2017 he was awarded the Commander with Star of the Order of the White Rose of Finland by the President of Finland.

== Works ==
=== Monographs and edited volumes ===
- Jarosław Suchoples, Finland and the United States, 1917–1919. The Early Years of Mutual Relations, Helsinki: Suomalaisen Kirjallisuuden Seura, 2000, ISBN 951-746-197-6.
- Jarosław Suchoples (ed.), Finland in the Documents of the US Department of State. January – July 1919, Greifswald: Publikationen des Lehrstuhls für Nordische Geschichte, Bd. 19, 2015.
- Jarosław Suchoples, Stephanie James, Barbara Törnquist-Plewa (eds.), World War II Re-explored. Some New Millennium Studies in the History of the Global Conflict, Frankfurt am Main: Peter Lang, 2019, ISBN 978-3-631-77740-4.
- Jarosław Suchoples, The Cold War Re-called, Frankfurt am Main: Peter Lang, 2024, ISBN 978-3-631-91444-1.

=== Chapters in edited volumes ===
- "Kaksi marsalkkaa" [chapter on Józef Piłsudski and Carl Gustaf Mannerheim], in: Mannerheim Puolan vuodet, eds. Anna and Jukka Soisalon-Soininen, Helsinki: Readme.fi, 2020, 256 pp., ISBN 978-952-373-093-9.
- "Two Marshals", in: Mannerheim. Polskie lata [Mannerheim. The Polish Years], eds. Anna and Jukka Soisalon-Soininen, Mińsk Mazowiecki: Muzeum Ziemi Mińskiej, 2023, pp. 264–286, ISBN 978-83-964025-9-2.
- "In the Shadow of the Eastern Neighbour. Finland in the Security Policy of Russia and the Soviet Union from Peter the Great to Contemporary Times", in: Wędrówki po dziejach. Jubilee Book of Professor Tadeusz Stegner, eds. A. Janicki, I. Janicka, Gdańsk: Wydawnictwo Uniwersytetu Gdańskiego, 2022, pp. 391–443, ISBN 978-83-8206-415-5.
- "The Polish Covid-19 Legislation: Strategy of the Populist Government During the Pandemic Crisis", in: COVID-19 and Governance: Crisis Reveals, Cham: Springer, 2021, ISBN 978-3-030-84311-3.
- "Polen und der österreichische Friedensvertrag von Saint-Germain-en-Laye (1919)", in: 100 Jahre Staatsvertrag von St. Germain – Der Rest ist Österreich!, ed. A. Raffeiner, Wien: Facultas, 2020, pp. 218–235, ISBN 978-3-99111-422-2.

=== Journal articles ===
- "Traktaty pokojowe zawarte z Rosją Radziecką przez Estonię i Finlandię w roku 1920" [Peace Treaties Concluded with Soviet Russia by Estonia and Finland in 1920], Dzieje Najnowsze, 2025.
- "Territorial Questions in Peace Treaties Between Soviet Russia and Its North-Western Neighbours (Estonia, Lithuania, Latvia and Finland), 1920", 2025.
- "La Finlande et le début de la guerre de Corée (1950) dans les documents du Département d'État Américain", NAQD Revue d'Etudes et de Critique Sociale 41–42, 2023, pp. 138–186.
- "In the Shadow of the Eastern Neighbour. Finland in the Security Policy of Russia and the Soviet Union from Peter the Great to Contemporary Times", Studia Europejskie – Studies in European Affairs 26, 4 (2022), pp. 9–38.
- "The Birth of the Legend. The odyssey of the cruiser 'Emden' as presented by the daily German press in 1914–1915", International Journal of Maritime History 29, 3 (2017), pp. 544–568.
- "The Beginning of WWII in Polish Narrative Films. 1948–1967: From the Tabooisation to the Partial Recognition as an Element of the National Memory", Central Europe 14, 2 (2016), pp. 87–105.

=== Translations ===
- Matti Klinge, Bałtycki świat [Itämeren maailma / The Baltic World], trans. Jarosław Suchoples, 1995, ISBN 951-1-16029-X.
- Matti Klinge, Krótka historia Finlandii [Katsaus Suomen historiaan / A Brief History of Finland], trans. Jarosław Suchoples, 1997, ISBN 951-1-15054-5.
- Matti Klinge, Fińska tradycja: eseje o strukturach i tożsamościach Północy [Finnish Tradition: Essays on the Structures and Identities of the North], trans. Jarosław Suchoples, 2006, ISBN 83-7432-047-8.
