= Jerzy Strzałka =

Polish fencer

Personal information
- Born: 28 March 1933 Motycz, Poland
- Died: 13 October 1976 (aged 43) Warsaw, Poland

Sport
- Sport: Fencing

Jerzy Strzałka (28 March 1933 – 13 October 1976) was a Polish fencer. He competed in the team épée event at the 1960 Summer Olympics.
