= Joanna Hofman =

Polish diplomat

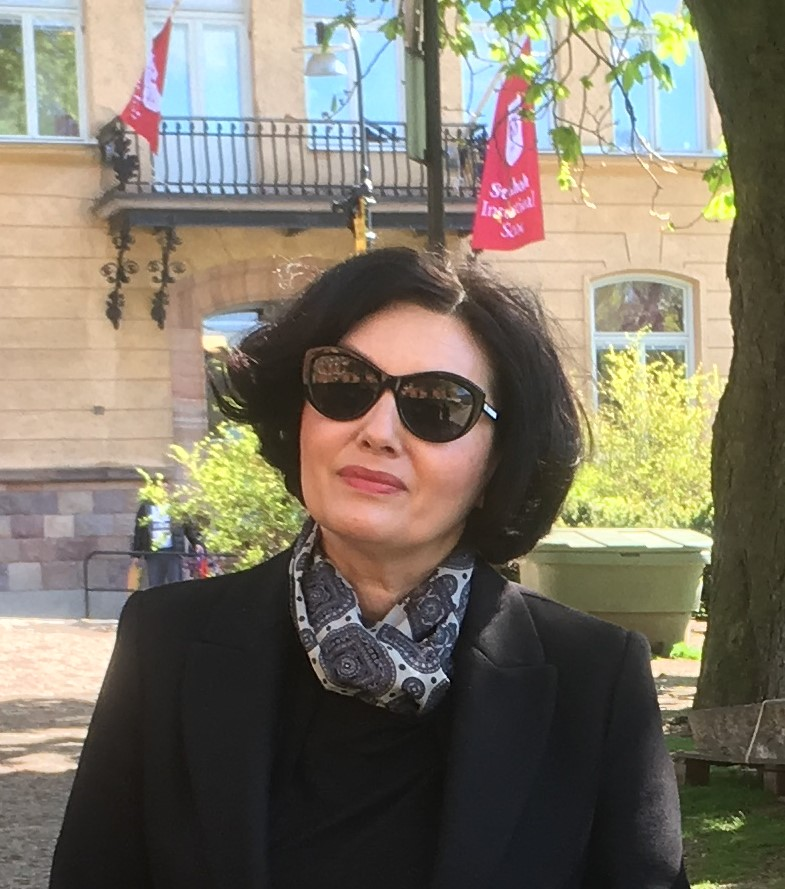

Poland Ambassador to Sweden
- In office 5 March 2020 – July 2024
- Appointed by: Andrzej Duda
- Monarch: Carl XVI Gustaf
- Preceded by: Wiesław Tarka
- Succeeded by: Karolina Ostrzyniewska

Poland Ambassador to Finland
- In office 14 September 2007 – 20 April 2011
- Appointed by: Lech Kaczyński
- President: Tarja Halonen
- Preceded by: Andrzej Szynka
- Succeeded by: Janusz Niesyto

Personal details
- Born: August 12, 1967 (age 59) Mrągowo
- Education: Aleksander Zelwerowicz National Academy of Dramatic Art in Warsaw, University of Warsaw
- Profession: Diplomat, actress
- Awards: Order of the White Rose of Finland

Joanna Hofman (born 12 August 1967, in Mrągowo) is a Polish actress and diplomat; and former ambassador to Finland (2007–2011) and Sweden (2020–2024).

== Life ==
Hofman graduated in 1990 from Acting Department at the Aleksander Zelwerowicz National Academy of Dramatic Art in Warsaw. She wrote her thesis on Scandinavian literature. Nine years later she finished also international relations at the University of Warsaw, as well as postgraduate studies on national security. In 2005, she did postgraduate diploma at the Academy of National Defence, Warsaw.

From 1990 to 1992 she was actress at the Comedy Theatre of Warsaw, and also cooperated with Polish Television and Polish Radio. She has been playing in movies, TV series, television plays.

In 2002, Hofman joined the Ministry of Foreign Affairs of Poland as head of the unit for contacts with Jewish diaspora. In 2003, she participated in the "International Visitor Program of the United States Department of State". From 2005 to 2007 she was posted at the embassy in Washington as a counsellor. Between 2007 and 2011, she served as ambassador to Finland. In June 2011, she became vice-president for corporate relations and international affairs of the Finnish company Fortum Corporation. Since 2014 she was representing the company in Turkey.

From 2017 to 2020 she was Director of the Polish Institute in Tel Aviv, Israel. In January 2020 she was nominated ambassador to Sweden, beginning her term on 5 March 2020. She ended her mission in July 2024.

Besides Polish, Hofman speaks English, and Russian.

== Filmography ==
- 1990: Mów mi Rockefeller
- 1993: Wow (episodes 4, 10)
- 1993: Łowca. Ostatnie starcie
- 1993: Czterdziestolatek. 20 lat później (episodes 3, 6, 8)
- 1994: Spółka rodzinna (episodes 7, 8)
- 1994: Panna z mokrą głową (movie)
- 1994: Panna z mokrą głową (series, episode 6)
- 1995: Sortez des rangs

== Honours ==
- First Class Commander of the Order of the White Rose of Finland (2011)
