= Adam Bugajski =

Polish civil servant

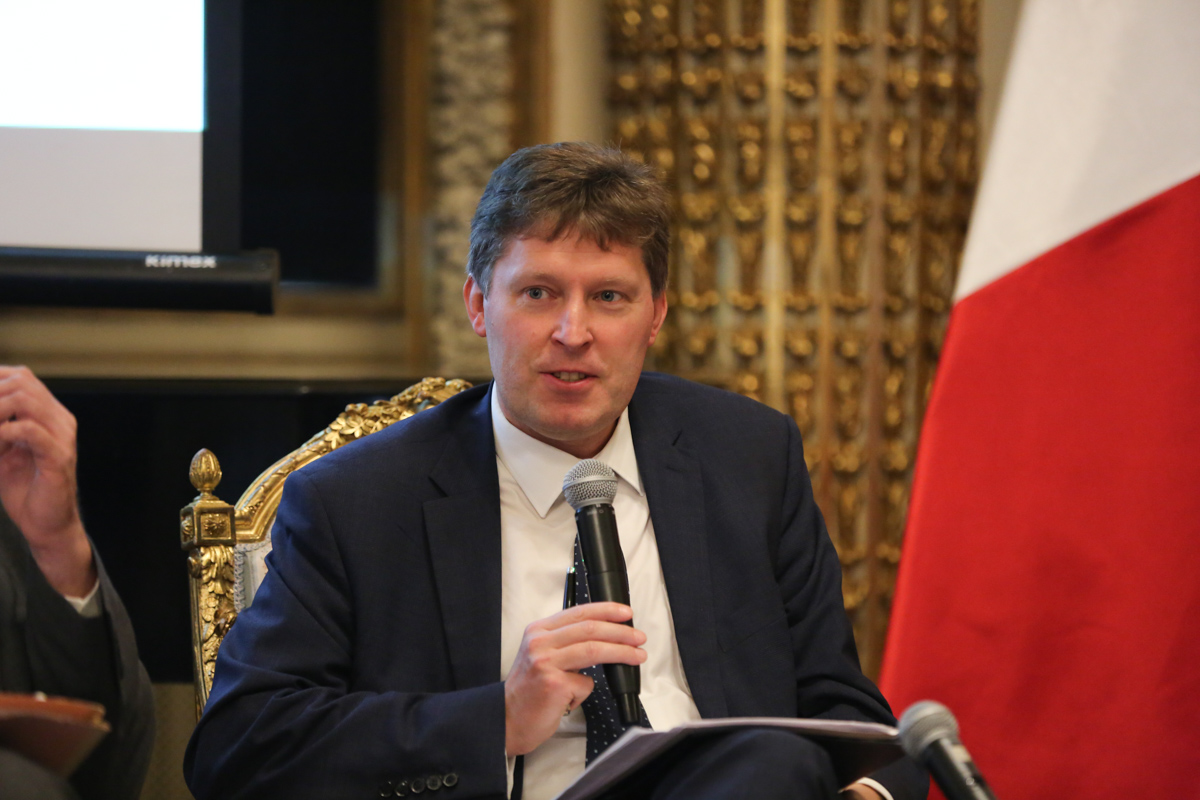
- Adam Bugajski (2022)

Poland Ambassador to the United Nations Office at Vienna
- In office 19 January 2015 – October 2019
- Preceded by: Przemysław Grudziński
- Succeeded by: Adam Hałaciński / Dominika Krois

Personal details
- Born: 11 June 1974 (age 52) Gdańsk
- Children: three
- Education: University of Gdańsk
- Profession: diplomat

Adam Zbigniew Bugajski (born 11 June 1974 in Gdańsk) is a Polish civil servant who served as a permanent representative to the United Nations Office at Vienna (2015–2019).

== Life ==
Adam Bugajski has graduated from history at the University of Gdańsk as well as the National School of Public Administration in Warsaw (1998–2000).

After graduation, he joined the Ministry of Foreign Affairs (MFA). He has been working at the Permanent Delegation of the Republic of Poland to NATO in Brussels (2003–2010), since 2008 as a deputy chief of the mission. He oversaw the overall performance of the Delegation, represented Poland at senior NATO fora and was responsible for drafting of key political documents, including declarations from NATO summits and ministerial meetings. Afterwards, he served as Deputy Director of the Department of Strategy and Foreign Policy Planning at the MFA, being in charge of development of the concept of long-term Polish foreign policy and its implementation. From 2011 to 2015, he was director of the Security Policy Department with responsibility for the Polish security policy, including relations with NATO, the Organization for Security and Co-operation in Europe (OSCE), security policy-related issues in the European Union and the arms control, disarmament and non-proliferation policy.

On 19 January 2015 Adam Bugajski was appointed the Permanent Representative of Poland to the UN Office and International Organisations in Vienna. At this post he assures Polish participation in a number of international organisations in Vienna, e.g.: OSCE, the International Atomic Energy Agency, the United Nations Industrial Development Organization, Preparatory Commission for the Comprehensive Nuclear-Test-Ban Treaty Organization. Ending his term in October 2019, Bugajski took the post of director of the Security Policy Department. In November 2026, he became Managing Director for Europe and Central Asia in the European External Action Service headquarters.

In 2012 he was decorated with the Silver Cross of Merit by the President of the Republic of Poland.

He can speak English, French, and to some extent, German languages. He is married with three children.
