= Turek, Poland =

Town in Greater Poland Voivodeship, Poland

Turek
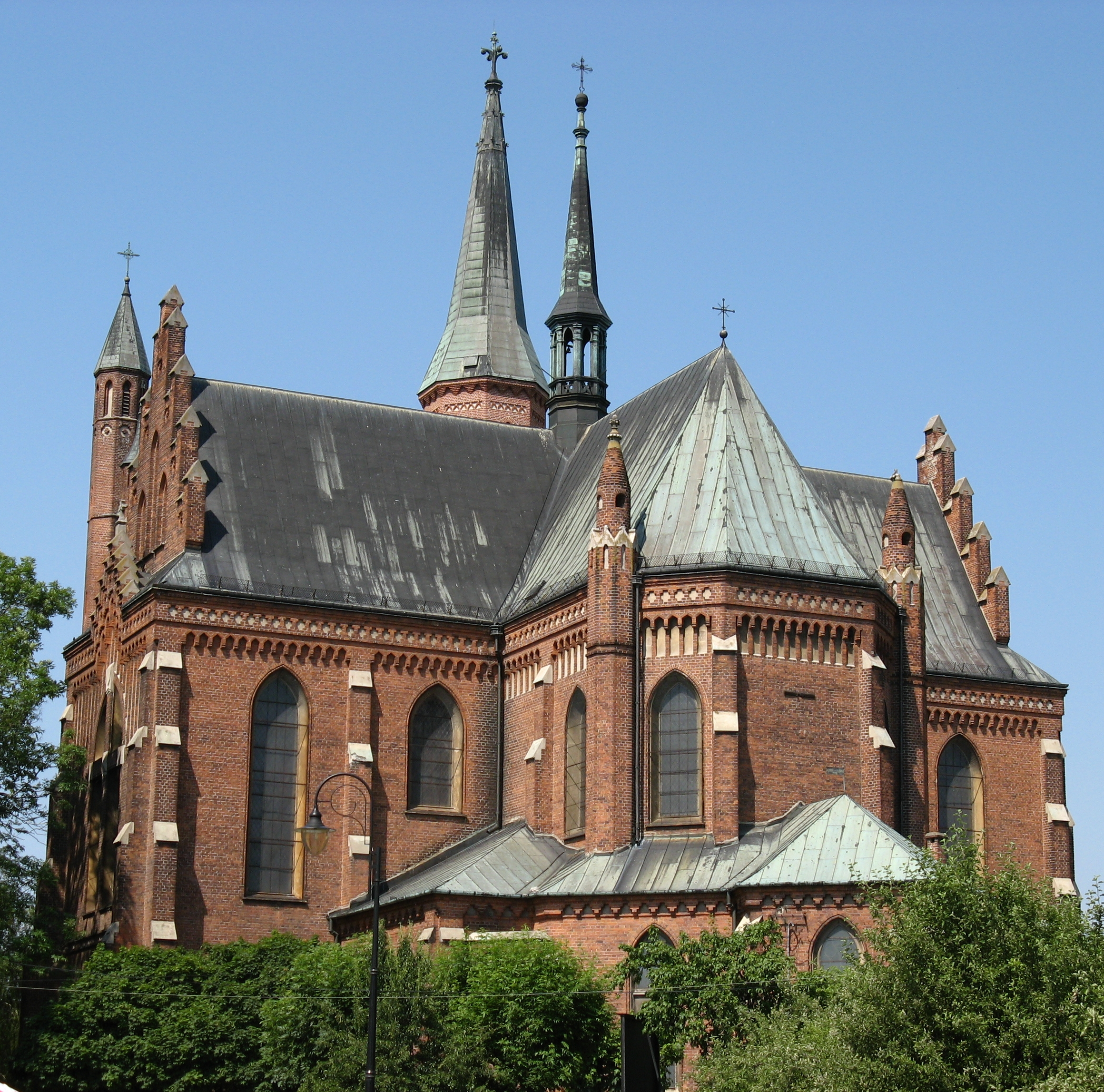
- Church of the Sacred Heart of Jesus

- Flag Coat of arms
- Motto: Turek zawsze po drodze / Miasto silne jak tur Turek always on your way / City strong as an aurochs
- Location within Poland
- Coordinates: 52°1′N 18°30′E
- Country: Poland
- Voivodeship: Greater Poland
- County: Turek
- Gmina: Turek (urban gmina)
- First mentioned: 1136
- Town rights: 1341

Government
  - Mayor: Romuald Antosik

Area
  - Total: 16.16 km^{2} (6.24 sq mi)
- Elevation: 113 m (371 ft)

Population (2009)
  - Total: 31,282
  - Density: 1,936/km^{2} (5,014/sq mi)
- Time zone: UTC+1 (CET)
  - Summer (DST): UTC+2 (CEST)
- Postal code: 62-700
- Area code: +48 63
- Vehicle registration: PTU
- Website: www.miastoturek.pl

Turek [ˈturɛk] is a town in central Poland with 31,282 inhabitants as of 2009. It is the capital of Turek County in the Greater Poland Voivodeship. It is located in the Sieradz Land.

== History ==
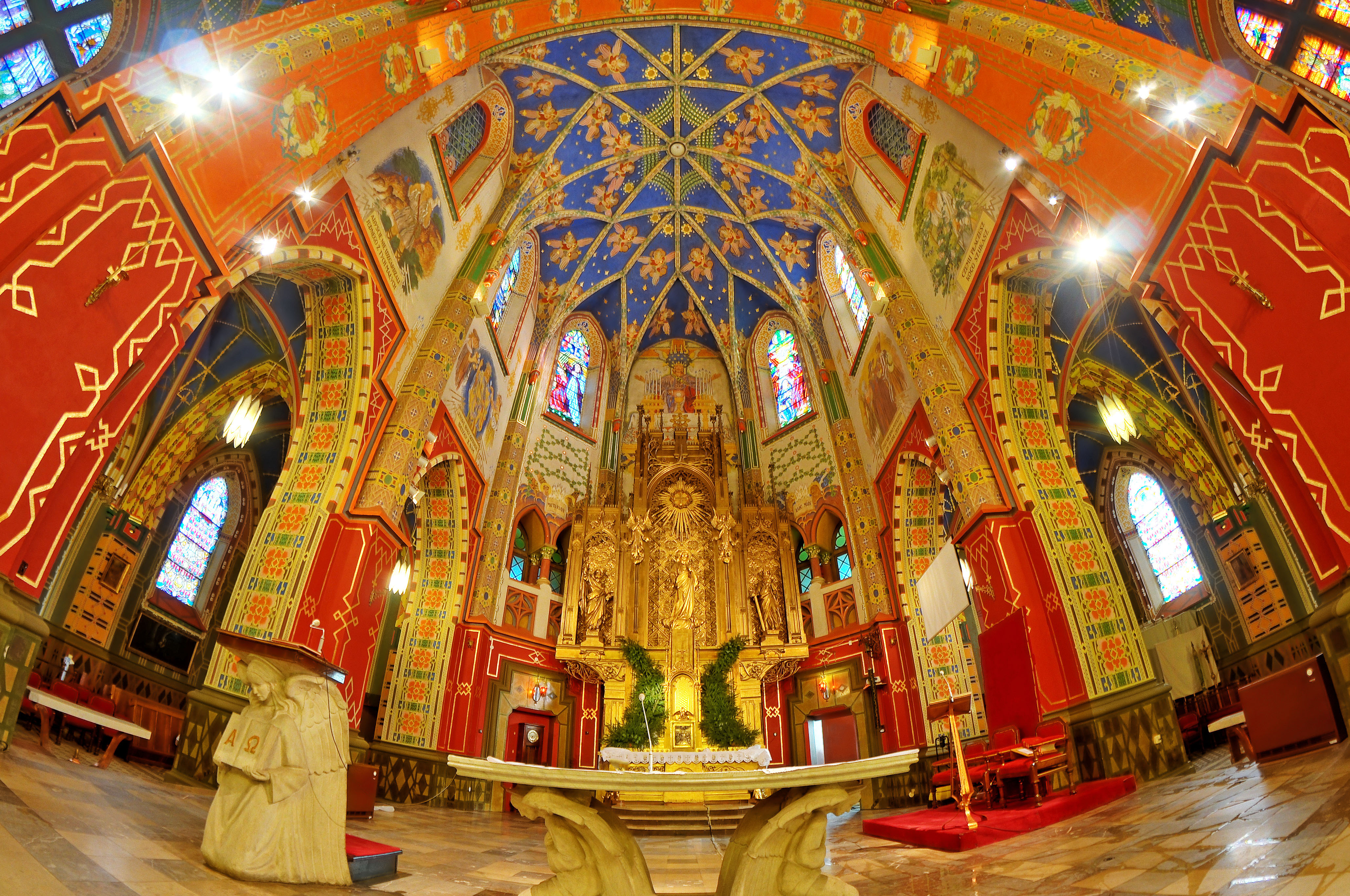
Interior of the Jesus Holiest Heart church, designed by Józef Mehoffer

Turek is first mentioned in the historical record 1136, when it was listed as belonging to the archbishops of Gniezno. It received its town rights in 1341. It was a private church town, administratively located in the Sieradz County in the Sieradz Voivodeship in the Greater Poland Province of the Kingdom of Poland.

Turek was annexed by Prussia in 1793 in the Second Partition of Poland, regained by Poles and included within the short-lived Duchy of Warsaw in 1807, and included within so-called Congress Poland in 1815, soon forcibly integrated with the Russian Empire. It was then capital of a district within the Kalisz Governorate. In 1826, Fryderyk Chopin travelled through the town. During the January Uprising, it was the site of clashes between Polish insurgents and Russian troops on August 20 and December 28, 1863. Following the end of the First World War in 1918, Turek became part of the Second Polish Republic as the country regained independence.

With the German invasion of Poland and the outbreak of the Second World War in September 1939, Turek was occupied by the Wehrmacht and annexed by Nazi Germany. It was administered as part of the county or district (kreis) of Turek within newly formed province of Reichsgau Wartheland. The Polish population was subjected to expulsions, confiscation of property, deportations to Nazi concentration camps and murder (see Nazi crimes against the Polish nation). In autumn of 1939, the Einsatzgruppe VI carried out a number of executions of Poles at the local market. Teachers from Turek were among Polish teachers murdered in the Mauthausen concentration camp. The first expulsion of 160 Poles was carried out in December 1939, and the expellees' shops, workshops and houses were then handed over to German colonists as part of the Lebensraum policy. A transit camp for Poles expelled from the region was operated in the town. During the German occupation, the nearly 3,000 Jews in Turek were brutalized, forced into an overcrowded ghetto in 1940, starved, and robbed of all their possessions. In 1941, some men were sent to forced labour camps near Poznań, but the majority of Turek's Jews were sent to a rural ghetto in Kowale Pańskie. In July 1942, most of them were sent to the Chełmno extermination camp where they were gassed immediately. Only around 30 Turek Jews survived the war.

With the arrival of the Red Army in 1945 and the end of the war, Turek was integrated into the People's Republic of Poland.

From 1975 to 1998, it was administratively located in the Konin Voivodeship.

== Transport ==
Turek lies on the intersection of national roads 83 and 72. National road 72 connects Turek to Konin to the west and to Łódź to the east. National road connects Turek to Sieradz to the south.

Vovoideship road 470 bypasses Turek to the west.

The nearest railway station is in Koło.

== Sports ==
The local football club is Tur Turek. It competes in the lower leagues.

== International relations ==
=== Twin towns – sister cities ===
Turek is twinned with:

- Wiesmoor, Germany
- Dunaivtsi, Ukraine
- Turhal, Turkey
- Rovinari, Romania
- Uniejów, Poland

== Notable people ==
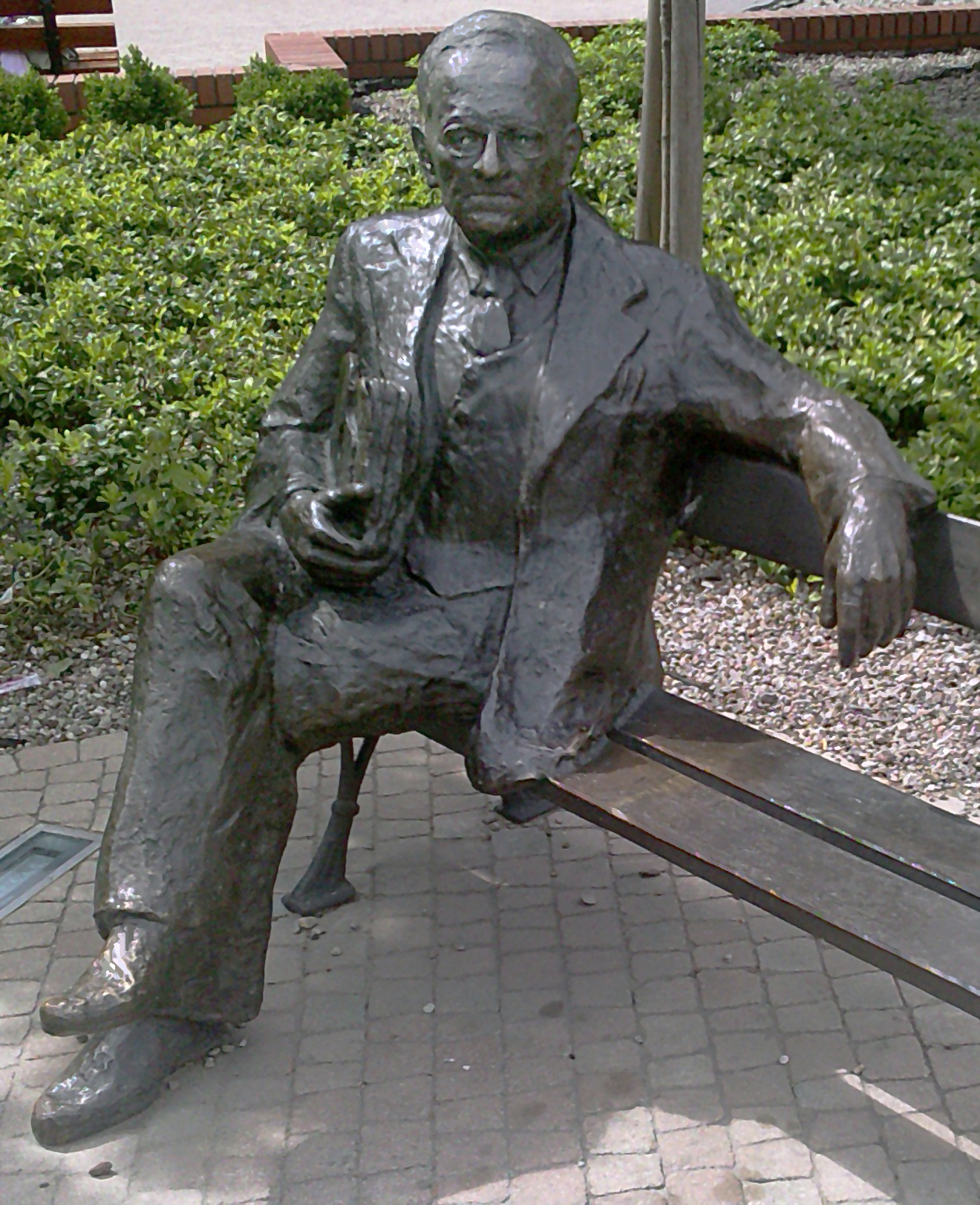
Mehoffer's Bench

- Roch Rupniewski (1802/04–1876), Polish poet and activist, participant in the November Uprising, born in Turek
- Ludwik Grossman (1835–1915), Polish musician, composer and conductor, born in Turek
- Józef Mehoffer (1869–1946), Polish painter and decorative artist
- Henryk (Henoch) Glicenstein (1870–1942), a Polish-American sculptor
- Yehuda Vidovsky (1919-2026), a Polish-Israeli holocaust survivor and super centenarian
- Felicjan Sławoj Składkowski (1885–1962), Polish physician, general, politician, Prime Minister of Poland
- Marian Cieplak (1893–1996), Polish diplomat, statesman, parliamentarian, director of the gymnasium in Turek before World War II
- Mieczysław Smorawiński (1893–1940), Polish general, victim of the Katyn massacre
- Włodzimierz Pietrzak (1913–1944), Polish poet, member of the Polish resistance movement in World War II, fallen in the Warsaw Uprising
- Tomasz Gatka (born 1974), Polish bobsledder
- Kamil Gardzielik (born 1992), Polish professional boxer

== See also ==
- Józef Piłsudski monument in Turek
