= Piotr Rychlik =

Polish diplomat

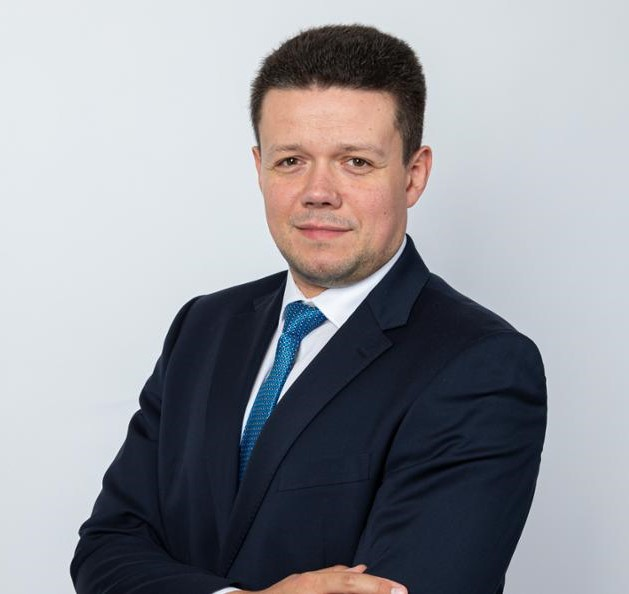

Poland Ambassador to Finland
- In office 9 October 2019 – 20 August 2023
- Appointed by: Andrzej Duda
- President: Sauli Niinistö
- Preceded by: Jarosław Suchoples

Personal details
- Born: 1984 (age 41–42) Olsztyn
- Spouse: Monika Anna Rychlik
- Education: University of Warmia and Mazury in Olsztyn
- Profession: Diplomat, legal scholar

Piotr Rychlik (born 1984 in Olsztyn) is a Polish diplomat who served as an ambassador of Poland to Finland (2019–2023).

== Life ==
Rychlik has graduated from law at the University of Warmia and Mazury in Olsztyn. In 2013 he defended there his PhD thesis on forensic aspects of terrorism. He has been working in Olsztyn as an assistant professor.

In 2009 he joined the Ministry of Foreign Affairs of Poland, Legal and Treaty Department. He was responsible for the status of diplomatic properties in Poland and abroad, legal aspects of international terrorism and sanctions. Since February 2018 he has been director of the Legal and Treaty Department. He was head of the Polish delegations to the United Nations, the European of the Union Council, the Council of Europe. Between 9 October 2019 and 2023 he served as Poland ambassador to Finland. He presented his letter of credence to the president Sauli Niinistö on 10 October 2019. He ended his term on 20 August 2023. From 26 August 2023 to 13 December 2023, he was Head of the Foreign Service.

Besides Polish, he speaks English, and Italian.
