= Tomasz Gatka =

Polish bobsledder

Personal information
- Nationality: Polish
- Born: 27 June 1974 (age 50); Turek, Poland

Sport
- Sport: Bobsleigh

Tomasz Gatka (born 27 June 1974) is a Polish bobsledder. He competed at the 1998 Winter Olympics and the 2002 Winter Olympics.
