= Maciej Ruczaj =

Polish diplomat

Maciej Ruczaj Ph.D.
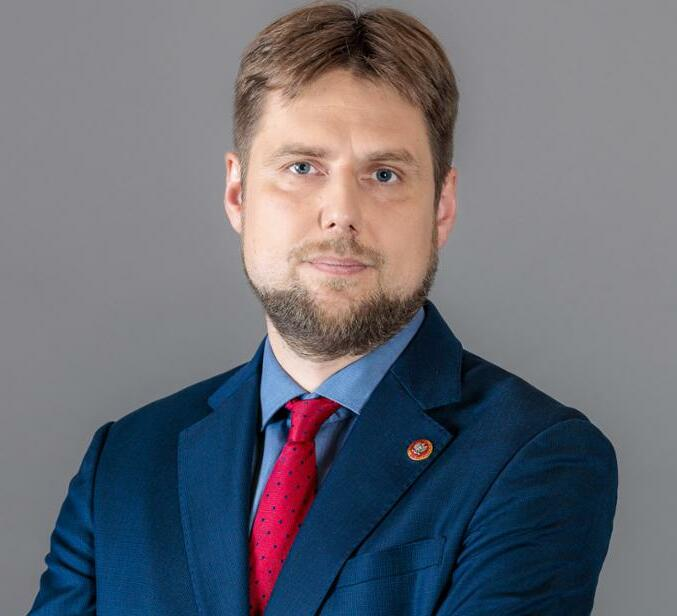
- Maciej Ruczaj in 2023

7th Poland Ambassador to Slovakia
- In office 14 October 2023 – July 2024
- President: Andrzej Duda
- Preceded by: Krzysztof Strzałka

Personal details
- Born: 1983 (age 42–43) Poznań, Poland
- Children: 3
- Education: Charles University
- Profession: Political scientist, diplomat

Maciej Ruczaj (born 1983) is a Polish political scientist and diplomat, who from 2023 to 2024 served as Poland's ambassador to Slovakia.

== Life ==
Ruczaj was born in 1983 in Poznań. He moved to Prague with his parents in late 1990s. He graduated from political science and international relations at the Faculty of Social Sciences, Charles University, as well as English studies and the Faculty of Arts, Charles University. His M.A. thesis on Flann O'Brien was awarded with Mathesius Award (2007). In 2015, he defended at the Charles University he defended his doctoral thesis on Patrick Pearse.

As a journalist and opinion journalist he has been publishing on Polish, Czech and Slovak history, literature and society in several media, e.g. "Lidové noviny", Echo24, "Międzynarodowy Przegląd Polityczny", .týždeň.

In late 2000s, he started his diplomatic career at the Polish Institute in Prague, since 2010 as a head of a unit. From 14 November 2016 to October 2023, he held the post of its Director. He was member of the Czech Program Council of the Polish–Czech Forum.

On 14 October 2023, he took the post of Polish ambassador to Slovakia, presenting his letter of credence to the President Zuzana Čaputová on 15 November 2023. He ended his mission in July 2024.

Besides Polish, he speaks fluently English and Czech. He has also knowledge of Spanish, Italian and Slovak languages.

He is married with three children.

== Honours ==
- 2016 – Pro Patria Medal, Poland
- 2022 – Medal of the Centenary of Regained Independence, Poland

== Books ==
- Josef Mlejnek, Maciej Ruczaj (ed.), Ze země Pana Nikoho. Zbigniew Herbert a Jan Zahradníček: dva básníci tváři v tvář totalitě, Praha: Dokořán, 2008, ISBN 978-80-7363-224-3.
- Ryszard Legutko, Maciej Ruczaj (ed.), Ošklivost demokracie a jiné eseje, Brno: CDK, 2009, ISBN 978-80-7325-184-0.
- Maciej Ruczaj, Maciej Szymanowski (ed.) Pravým okem. Antologie současného polského politického myšlení, Brno: CDK, 2010, ISBN 978-80-7325-211-3.
- Maciej Ruczaj (ed.), Návrat člověka bez vlastnosti. Krize kultury v současné polské esejistice, Brno: CDK, 2010, ISBN 978-80-7325-210-6.
- Andrzej Nowak, Maciej Ruczaj (ed.), Impérium a ti druzí. Eseje z moderních dějin východní Evropy, Brno: CDK, 2010, ISBN 978-80-7325-222-9.
- Maciej Ruczaj (ed.), Jagellonské dědictví. Kapitoly z dějin středo-východní Evropy., Brno: CDK, 2012, ISBN 978-80-7325-274-8.
- Tadeusz Gajcy, Maciej Ruczaj (ed.), Zády opřen o věčnost, Prague: MAKE detail, 2014, ISBN 978-80-905124-8-1.
- Maciej Ruczaj (ed.), Chtěli jsme být svobodní… Příběhy z Varšavského povstání 1944, Ostrava: PANT, 2015, ISBN 978-80-905942-6-5.
- Petr Fiala, Maciej Ruczaj (ed.), Koniec beztroski: o Europie, demokracji i polityce, jakiej nie chcemy, Kraków: Ośrodek Myśli Politycznej, 2016, ISBN 978-83-64753-54-1.
