= List of ambassadors of Poland to Sweden =

Poland Ambassador to Sweden
- Ambasador Rzeczypospolitej Polskiej w Szwecji
- Coat of arms of Poland
- Incumbent; Karolina Ostrzyniewska (chargé d'affaires a.i.) since 2024
- Style: Madam Ambassador (informal); Her Excellency (diplomatic)
- Reports to: Polish Ministry of Foreign Affairs
- Seat: Stockholm, Sweden
- Appointer: President of Poland
- Term length: No fixed term
- Website: Embassy of Poland, Sweden

The Polish ambassador to Sweden (Swedish: Polen ambassadör i Sverige) serves as the official diplomatic representative of the president and the government of Poland to the king and the government of the Kingdom of Sweden.

As with all Polish ambassadors, the ambassador to Denmark is nominated by the president of Poland and confirmed by the Parliamentary Commission of the Foreign Affairs. The ambassador serves at the pleasure of the president, and enjoys full diplomatic immunity.

Poland Embassy in Sweden is located in Stockholm.

== List of ambassadors of Poland to Sweden ==
=== Second Polish Republic ===
- 1919–1924: Jan Zygmunt Michałowski (envoy)
- 1924–1928: Alfred Wysocki (envoy)
- 1928–1934: Konstanty Rozwadowski (envoy)
- 1934–1936: Antoni Roman (envoy)
- 1936–1942: Gustaw Potworowski (envoy)
- 1942–1945: Henryk Sokolnicki (chargé d'affaires)

=== People's Polish Republic ===
- 1945–1948: Adam Ostrowski
- 1948–1950: Czesław Bobrowski
- 1950–1954: Eugeniusz Milnikiel (envoy)
- 1953–1957: Józef Koszutski
- 1957–1964: Antoni Szymanowski
- 1965–1969: Michał Kajzer
- 1969–1972: Stanisław Bejm
- 1972–1978: Stanisław Staniszewski
- 1978–1983: Paweł Cieślar
- 1983–1987: Maria Regent-Lechowicz
- 1987–1991: Sławomir Dąbrowa
- 1991–1997: Barbara Tuge–Erecińska
- 1997–2001: Ryszard Czarny
- 2001–2005: Marek Prawda
- 2005–2010: Michał Czyż
- 2010–2014: Adam Hałaciński
- 2014–2018: Wiesław Tarka
- 2018–2020: Iwona Jabłonkowska (chargé d'affaires a.i.)
- 2020–2024: Joanna Hofman
- since 2024: Karolina Ostrzyniewska (chargé d'affaires a.i.)

== See also ==
- Poland–Sweden relations
- List of ambassadors of Sweden to Poland
