= Grzegorz Kozłowski =

Polish diplomat

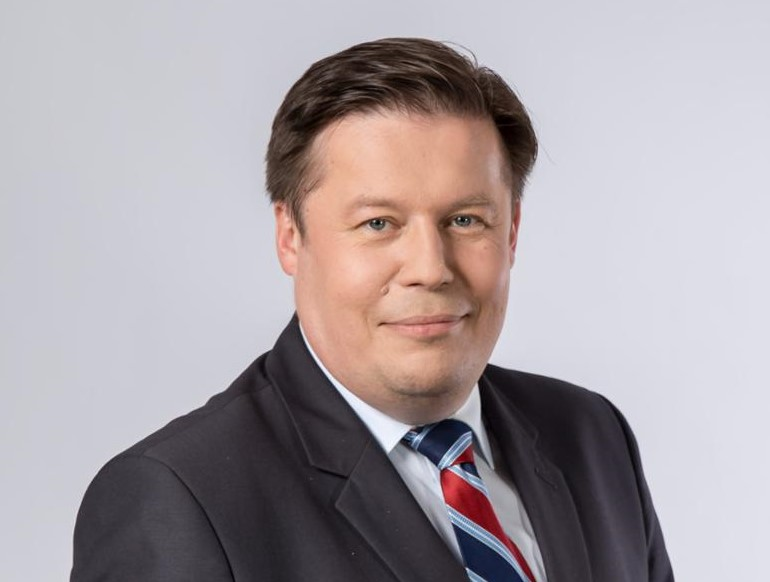

Poland Ambassador to Estonia
- In office 14 February 2018 – 30 September 2023
- Appointed by: Andrzej Duda
- President: Kersti Kaljulaid; Alar Karis
- Preceded by: Robert Filipczak
- Succeeded by: Artur Orzechowski

Personal details
- Born: 31 March 1974 (age 52) Warsaw
- Spouse: Jolanta Kozłowska
- Education: University of Białystok; Warsaw School of Economics
- Profession: diplomat, economist

Grzegorz Kozłowski (born 31 March 1974, Warsaw) is a Polish diplomat and economist who served an ambassador of Poland to Estonia between 2018 and 2023.

== Life ==
Grzegorz Kozłowski has graduated from law at the University of Białystok (1998) and finance at the Warsaw School of Economics (1999) where he received also Ph.D. in economics (2007). In 2022, he received on the University of Warmia and Mazury in Olsztyn a Habilitation degree in political science.

He started his professional career in 1997 at the Ministry of Finance where he was dealing with financial aspects of Poland’s accession to NATO. In 1999 he began his diplomatic career at the Ministry of Foreign Affairs (MFA). Until 2004 he was working at the Permanent Delegation of Poland to NATO and WEU. Between 2004 and 2008 he worked at the MFA Security Policy Department where he was engaged in Polish-US missile defence negotiations. In 2008 he took a position of a head of economic section at the Embassy in Washington, D.C. where he was responsible for bilateral energy cooperation and economic promotion of Poland. In 2012 he became a deputy director of the Economic Cooperation Department and in 2013 a director of the America’s Department where he continued his assignment until January 2018.

On 14 February 2018 he presented his credentials to the President of Estonia Kersti Kaljulaid and, therefore, became Poland ambassador to Estonia. In December 2021, Kozłowski received from the Minister of Foreign Affairs "Amicus Oeconomiae" award for his effort in promoting Polish business abroad. He ended his term on 30 September 2023.

He was member of the Council of the Fulbright Foundation in Poland between 2013 and 2016.

He speaks English and French.

== Honours ==
- Order of the Cross of Terra Mariana, 3rd Class (Estonia, 2023)
