= Wiesław Tarka =

Polish politician (born 1964)

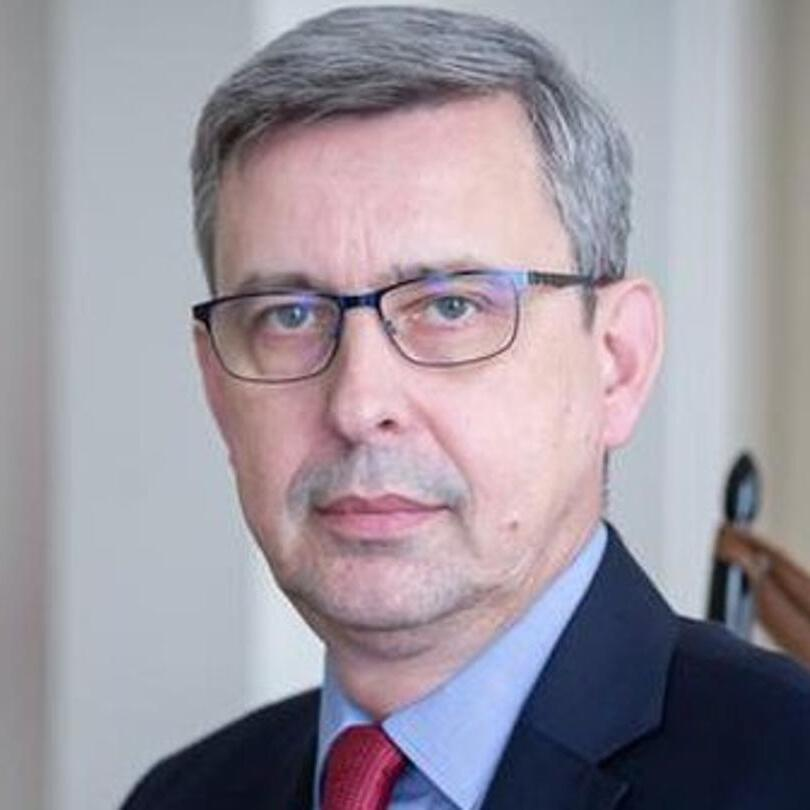

4th Poland Ambassador to Croatia
- In office 2008 – 31 July 2012
- Preceded by: Kazimierz Kopyra
- Succeeded by: Maciej Szymański

Poland Ambassador to Sweden
- In office 4 November 2014 – 30 June 2018
- Preceded by: Adam Hałaciński
- Succeeded by: Joanna Hofman

Personal details
- Born: 30 June 1964 (age 62) Bydgoszcz, Poland
- Education: University of Warsaw
- Profession: Diplomat

Wiesław Karol Tarka (born 30 June 1964 in Bydgoszcz) is a Polish diplomat, Poland Ambassador to Croatia (2008–2012) and Sweden (2014–2018).

== Life ==
Wiesław Tarka finished High School No. 6, Bydgoszcz. He has graduated from German studies at the University of Warsaw (M.A., 1988). He was studying also in Germany

During 1989 Polish legislative election campaign he was Solidarity Citizens' Committee volunteer, next two years cooperating in creating the foreign policy of the committee.

He started his career as an assistant and Swedish language teacher between 1988–1991 and 1996–1997. He was working at the embassy in Stockholm between 1991 and 1996. He was back there between 1998 and 2002. From 2003 to 2005 he was head of the promotion and international cooperation unit at the Masovian Voivodeship Marshal's Office, and, afterwards, Culture Bureau deputy director at the City of Warsaw office. In 2005, he joined the Ministry of Foreign Affairs.

Between 15 November 2005 and 20 November 2007 he was the Undersecretary of State at the Ministry of Interior, being responsible for international cooperation, migration policy, Schengen Area and Phare issues. In 2008 he became Poland ambassador to Croatia, ending his term on 31 July 2012. Since 4 November 2014 he was nominated an ambassador to Sweden, presenting his letter of credence to king Carl XVI Gustav on 5 February 2015. He returned to Poland in June 2018 and took the post of the deputy director of the European Policy Department. Since June 2022 he serves as the deputy Ambassador to France.

Currently, he is the Coordinator of the 2019 Western Balkans Summit in Poznań.

He speaks English, German, Swedish, Croatian, French and Russian languages.

== Honours ==
- Order of Polonia Restituta, Knight's Cross (Poland, 2012)
- Order of Duke Branimir (Croatia, 2012)
