= Polish Institute =

The Polish Institutes
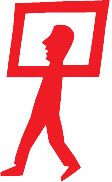
- Founder: Polish government
- Type: Cultural institution
- Region served: 24 countries, worldwide
- Services: Polish cultural and language education

The Polish Institutes is a network of cultural diplomatic missions reporting to the Ministry of Foreign Affairs of Poland. As of 2026, there were 27 of them. Their mission is described as "creating a positive image of Poland abroad" by promoting Polish culture, history, science, language, and national heritage. Other tasks include supporting cultural exchange, in particular, within the framework of the European Union National Institutes for Culture, as well as implementation of various international cultural programmes.

Polish Institutes cooperate with local institutions and NGOs in organizing various events. The names may slightly differ in some countries. For example, in London and New York, the institute is called "Polish Cultural Institute".

== Locations ==
Seats of Polish Institutes

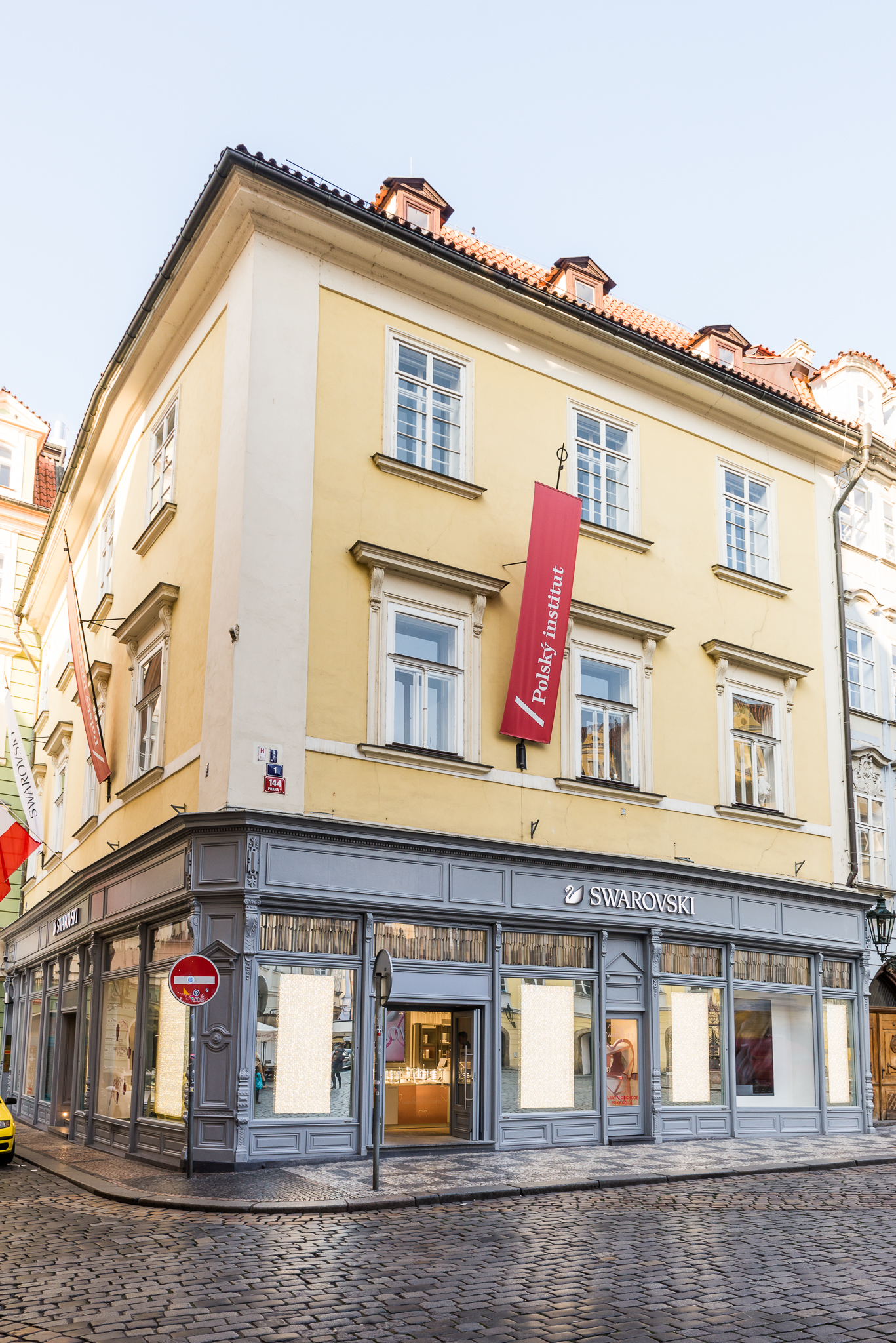
Prague

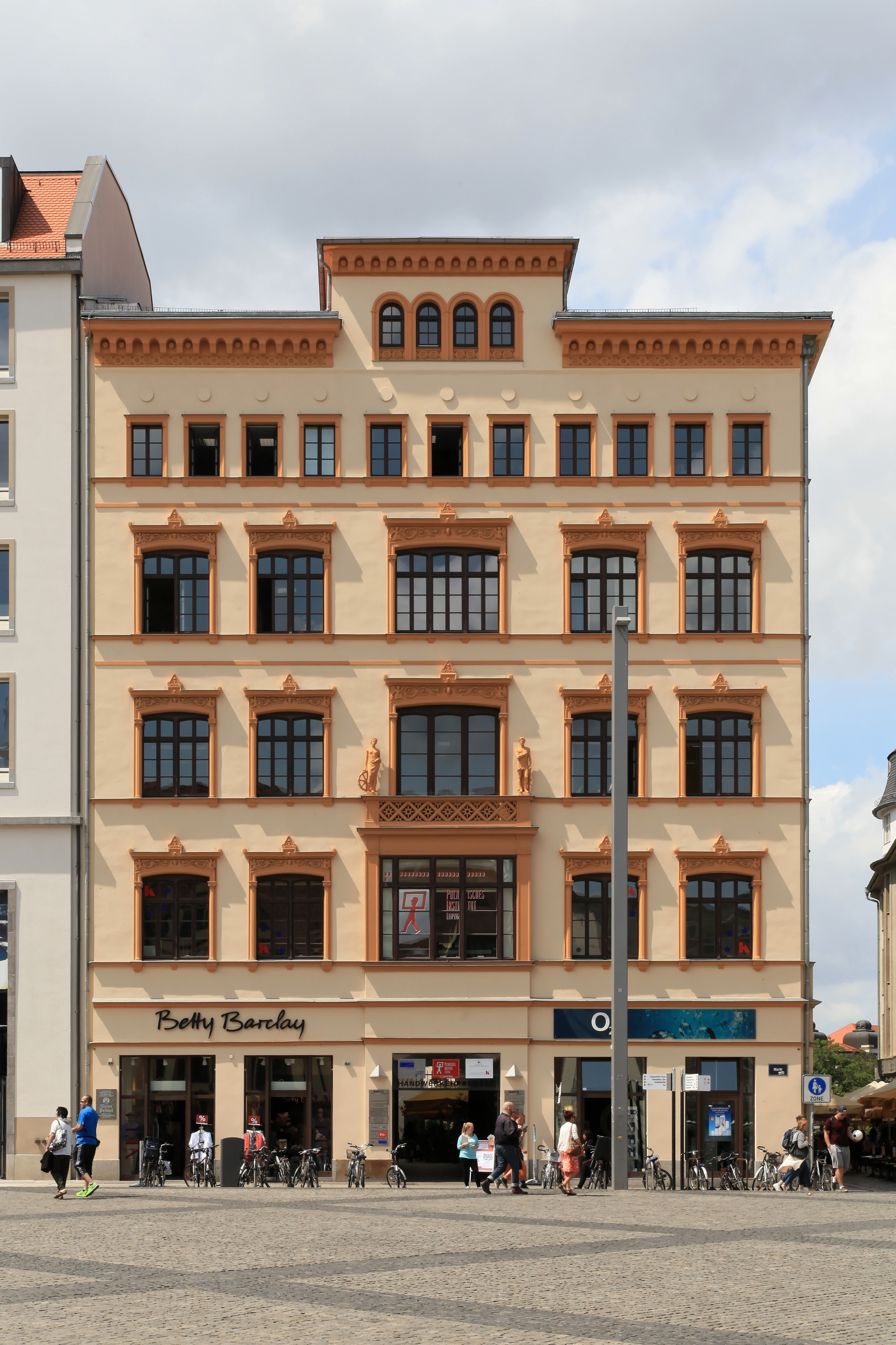
Leipzig

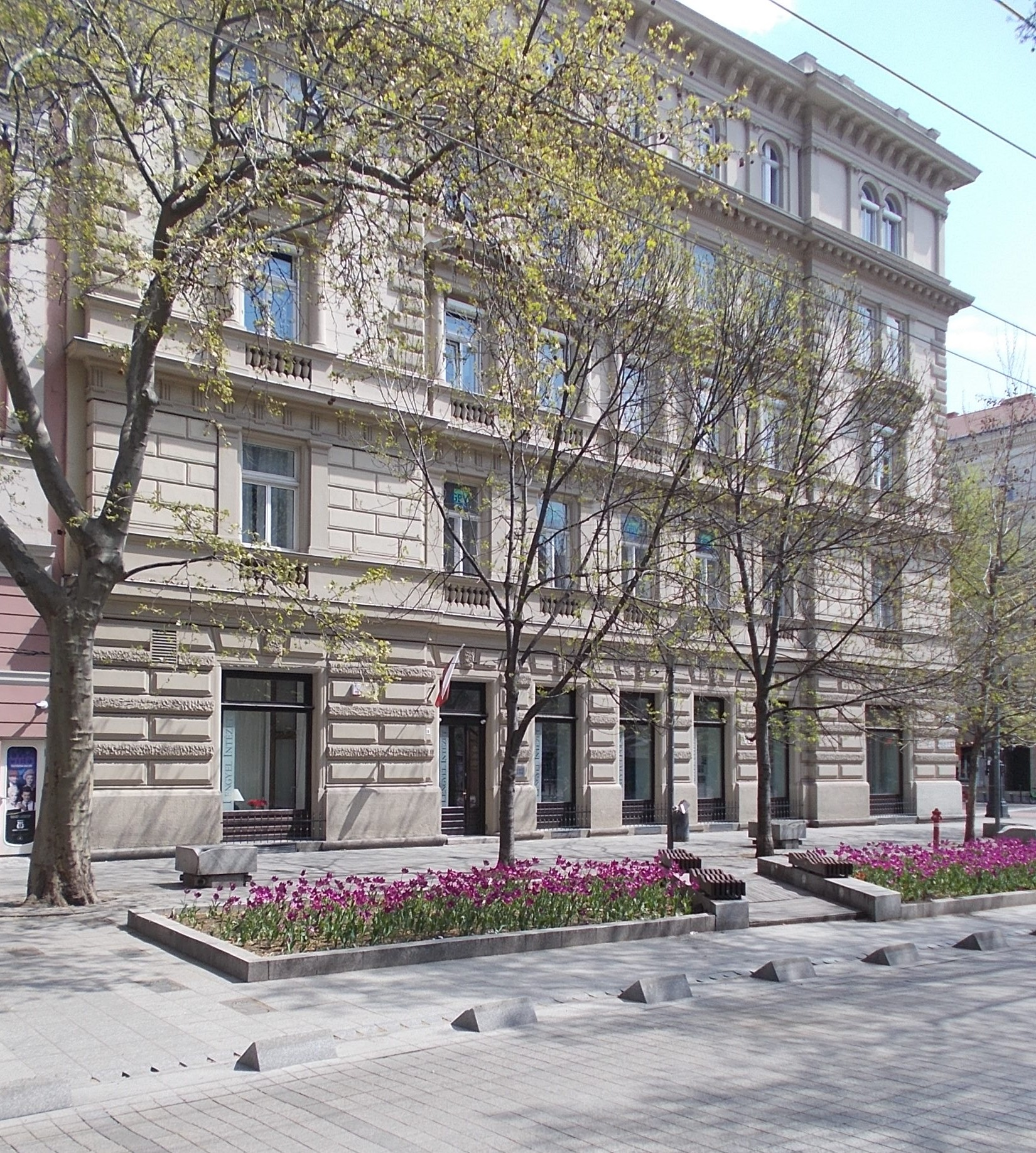
Budapest

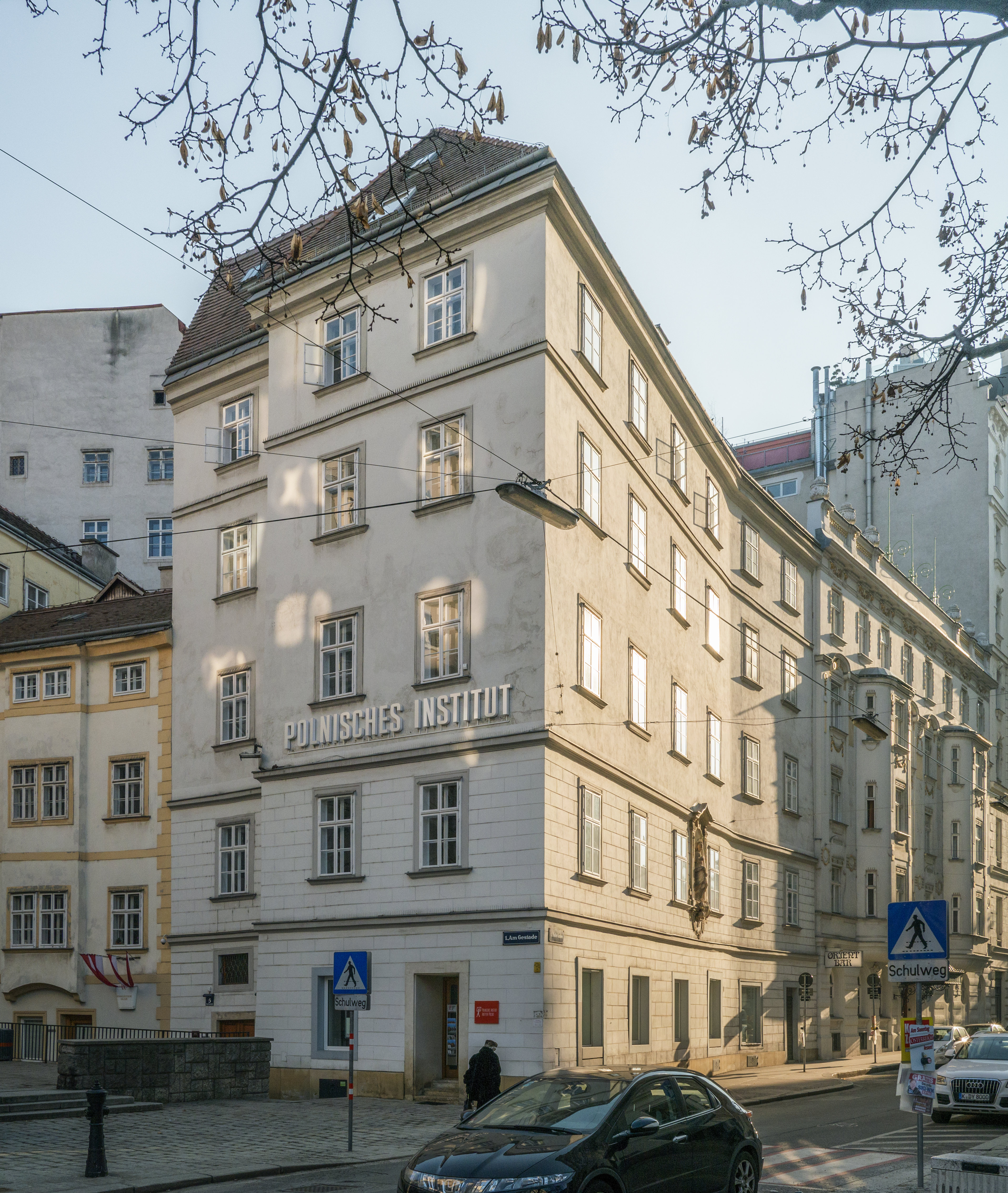
Vienna

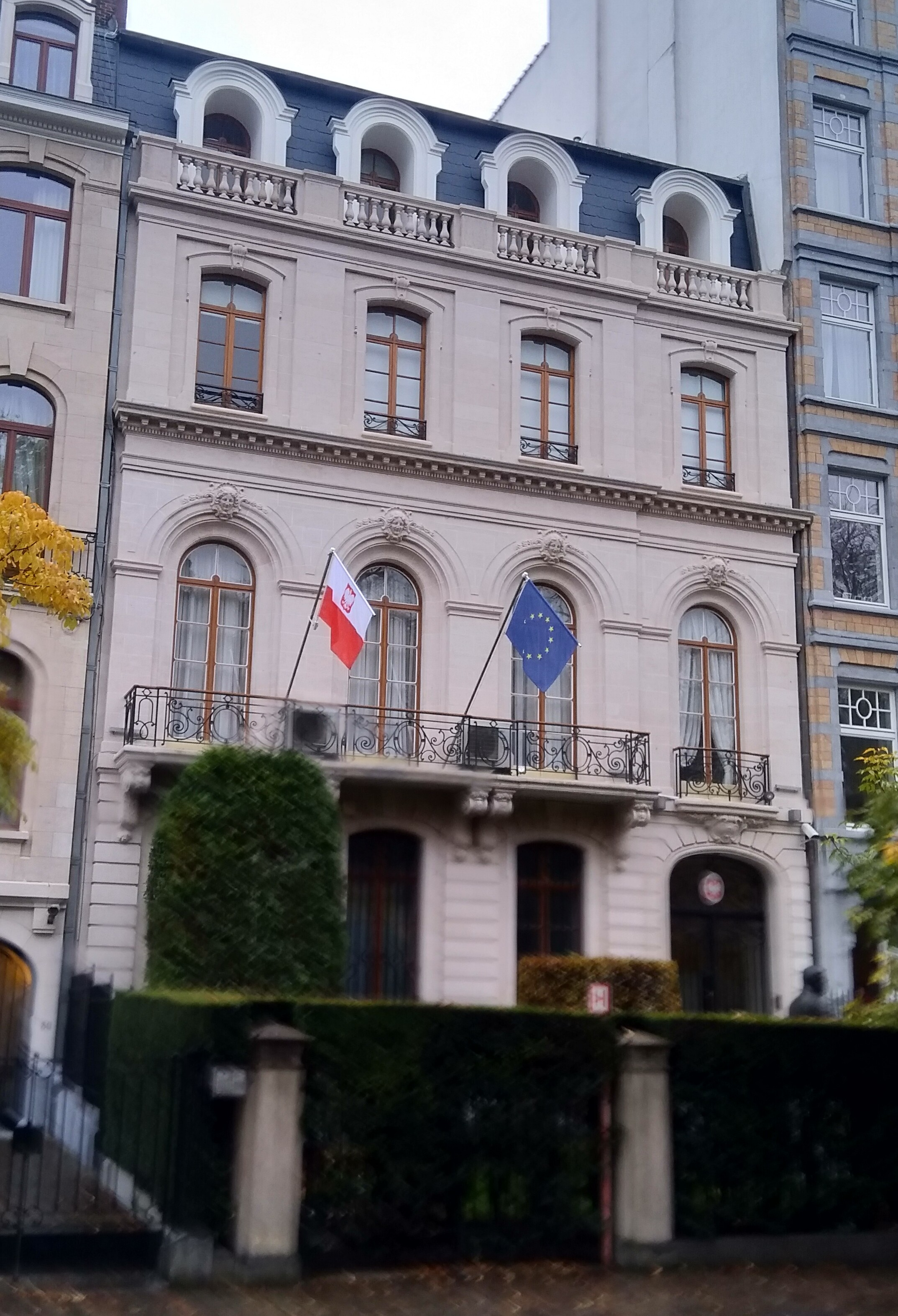
Brussels

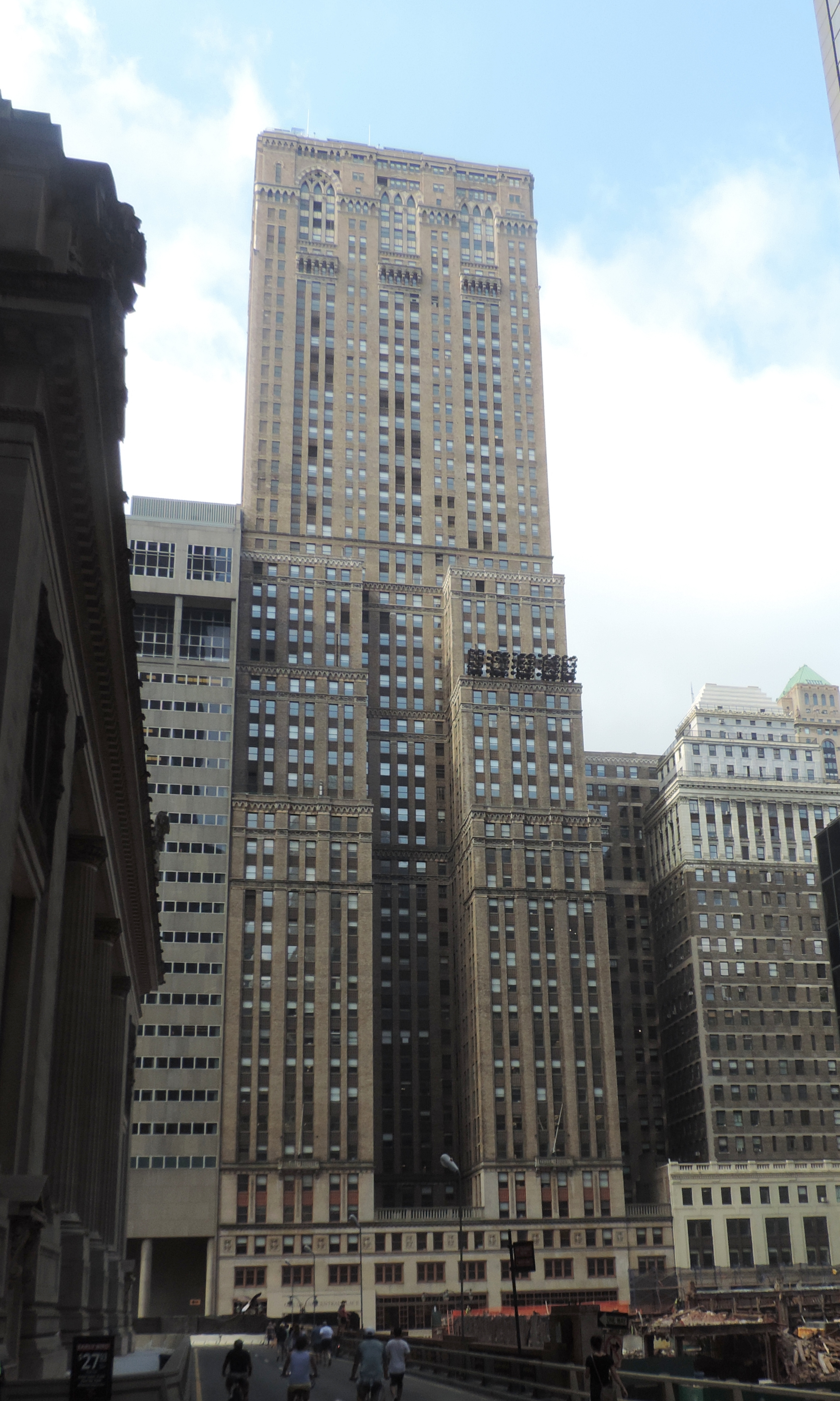
New York City

| Location | Name of the institute in Polish | Local name |
|---|---|---|
| (Serbia) Belgrade | Instytut Polski w Belgradzie | Poljski institut u Beogradu |
| (Germany) Berlin | Instytut Polski w Berlinie | Polnisches Institut in Berlin |
| (Slovakia) Bratislava | Instytut Polski w Bratysławie | Poľský Inštitút Bratislava |
| (Belgium) Brussels | Instytut Polski w Brukseli | Service culturel de l’Ambassade de Pologne |
| (Hungary) Budapest | Instytut Polski w Budapeszcie | Lengyel Intézet Budapest |
| (Romania) Bucharest | Instytut Polski w Bukareszcie | Institutul Polonez din Bucureşti |
| (Germany) Düsseldorf | Instytut Polski w Düsseldorfie | Polnisches Institut Düsseldorf |
| (Turkey) Istanbul | Instytut Polski w Stambule | İstanbul Polonya Kültür Merkezi |
| (Ukraine) Kyiv | Instytut Polski w Kijowie | Польський Інститут у Києві |
| (Germany) Leipzig | Instytut Polski w Berlinie, filia w Lipsku | Polnisches Institut Berlin / Filiale Leipzig |
| (United Kingdom) London | Instytut Kultury Polskiej w Londynie | Polish Cultural Institute in London |
| (Spain) Madrid | Instytut Polski w Madrycie | Instituto Polaco de Cultura en Madrid |
| (Belarus) Minsk | Instytut Polski w Mińsku | Польскі Інстытут ў Мінску |
| (Russia) Moscow | Instytut Polski w Moskwie | Польский культурный центр в Москве |
| (India) New Delhi | Instytut Polski w Nowym Delhi | Polish Cultural Institute in New Delhi |
| (United States) New York City | Instytut Kultury Polskiej w Nowym Jorku | Polish Cultural Institute in New York |
| (France) Paris | Instytut Polski w Paryżu | Institut Polonais Paris |
| (China) Beijing | Instytut Polski w Pekinie | 波兰共和国驻华大使馆文化处 |
| (Czech Republic) Prague | Instytut Polski w Pradze | Polský institut v Praze |
| (Italy) Rome | Instytut Polski w Rzymie | Istituto Polacco di Roma |
| (South Korea) Seoul | Instytut Polski w Seulu | |
| (Bulgaria) Sofia | Instytut Polski w Sofii | Полски институт в София |
| (Sweden) Stockholm | Instytut Polski w Sztokholmie | Polska institutet i Stockholm |
| (Israel) Tel Aviv | Instytut Polski w Tel Awiwie | המכון הפולני בישראל |
| (Georgia (country)) Tbilisi | Instytut Polski w Tbilisi | პოლონური ინსტიტუტი თბილისში |
| (Japan) Tokyo | Instytut Polski w Tokio | ポーランド広報文化センター |
| (Austria) Vienna | Instytut Polski w Wiedniu | Polnisches Institut Wien |
| (Lithuania) Vilnius | Instytut Polski w Wilnie | Lenkijos institutas Vilniuje |

== Notable people ==
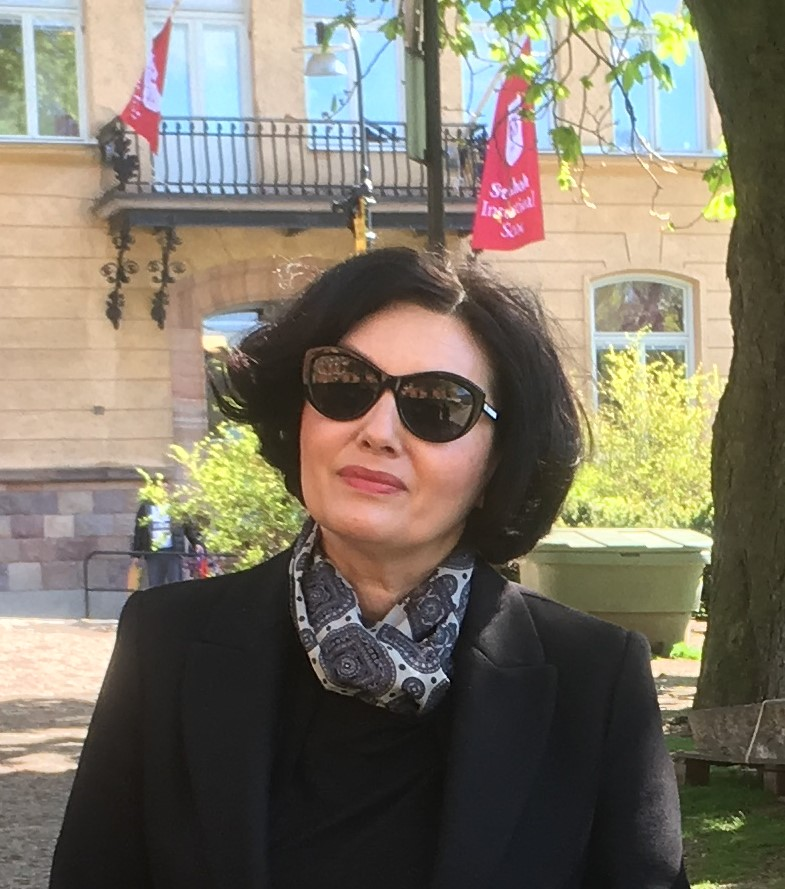
Joanna Hofman

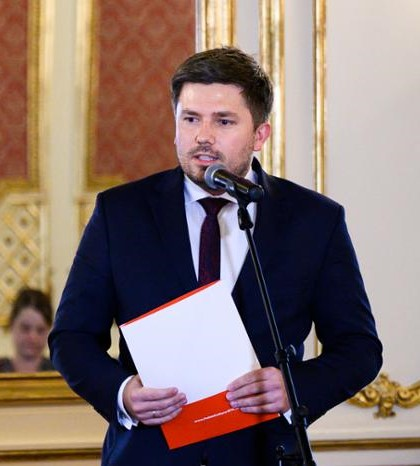
Adrian Kubicki

- Leszek Włodzimierz Biały (born 1954), Deputy Director of the Polish Institute in Bucharest (2013–17); ambassador to Panama (2017–23).
- Urszula Doroszewska (born 1954), Director of the Polish Institute in Minsk (2013–15); ambassador to Georgia (2008–13) and Lithuania (2017–23).
- Joanna Hofman (born 1967), Director of the Polish Institute in Tel Aviv (2017–20); ambassador to Finland (2007–11), ambassador to Sweden (2020–24).
- Mirosław Jasiński (born 1960), Director of the Polish Institute in Prague (2001–05); ambassador to the Czech Republic (2021–22)
- Iwona Kozłowska, Deputy Director of the Polish Institute in Berlin (1999–2001); ambassador to Switzerland (2020–24)
- Adrian Kubicki (born 1987), Director of the Polish Cultural Institute in New York (2019–20); Consul General of Poland in New York City (2020–24).
- Andrzej Papierz (born 1966), Director of Polish Institute in Sofia (2001–06); ambassador to Bulgaria (2007–10) and to Montenegro (2023–24), Consul General in Almaty (2013–16) and in Istanbul (2017–18), Undersecretary of State at the Ministry of Foreign Affairs (2018), and Director General of the Foreign Service (2018–21).
- Maciej Ruczaj (born 1983), Director of the Polish Institute in Prague (2016–23); ambassador to Slovakia (2023–24).
- Piotr Skwieciński (born 1963), Director of the Polish Institute in Moscow (2019–22); ambassador to Armenia (2023–24).

== See also ==
- Polish Institute and Sikorski Museum
