= Rafał Siemianowski =

Polish diplomat

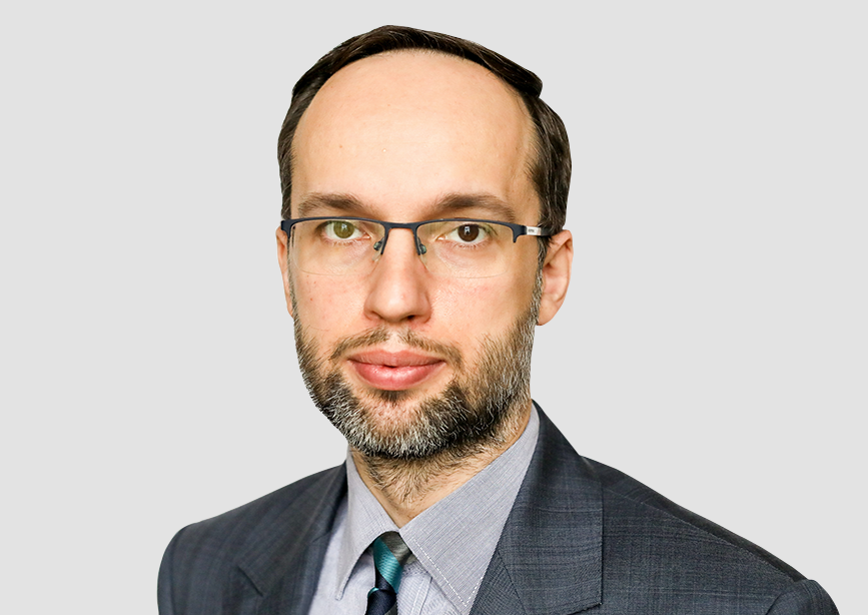

Poland Ambassador to Belgium
- In office 20 November 2021 – 31 July 2024
- Preceded by: Artur Orzechowski

Personal details
- Born: 25 October 1980 (age 45) Opole, Poland
- Children: 1
- Education: University of Warsaw; National School of Public Administration
- Profession: Official, diplomat

Rafał Piotr Siemianowski (born 25 October 1980 in Opole) is a Polish civil servant, from 2021 to 2024 he served as ambassador to Belgium.

== Life ==
Siemianowski graduated from international relations at the University of Warsaw (2004) and the National School of Public Administration, KSAP (2006). Between 2008 and 2009 he was president of the KSAP alumni association. He has been educated also at the IESE Business School, Barcelona, Spain and at the Georgetown University, Washington, D.C. He gained his experience as an intern at the Embassy of Poland in Bern, Switzerland (2002), at the Prefecture of the Manche Department in France (2005), at the EU Directorate-General for External Relations (2009/2010).

In 2004, Siemianowski started his professional career at the Marshal's Office of the Opole Voivodeship. In 2006 he joined the Chancellery of the Prime Minister of Poland, being promoted from a chief specialist to an advisor to the Head of the Chancellery and the Deputy Director of the Secretariat/Office of the Prime Minister. Between 2012 and 2015 he served at the Embassy of Poland, London as counsellor for scientific and academic cooperation as well as political affairs. In 2015, he returned to the post of the Deputy Director of the Office of the Prime Minister. In 2017, he was appointed to the Board of the Polish National Agency for Academic Exchange. On 23 October 2020 he became Undersecretary of State, Deputy Head of the Chancellery of the Prime Minister. In 2021, Siemianowski was nominated Poland ambassador to Belgium. He took the post on 20 November 2021. He ended his mission on 31 July 2024.

He is married, with one daughter.
