= Grzegorz Marek Poznański =

Polish diplomat and fencer

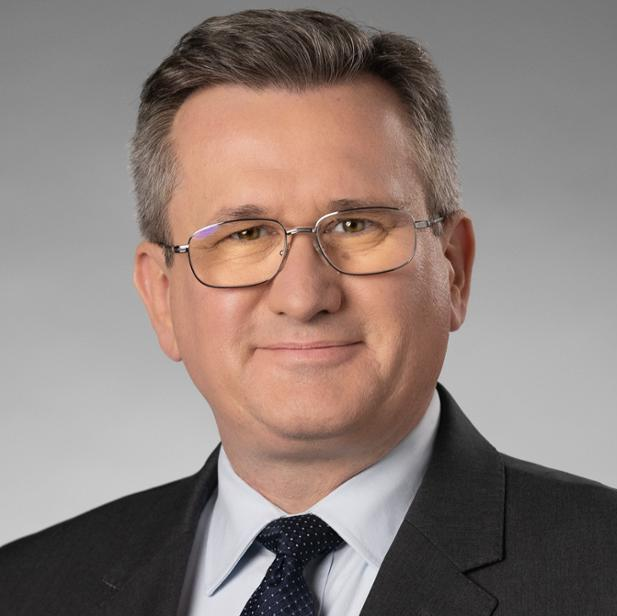
- Grzegorz Marek Poznański (2024)

Director General of the Council of the Baltic Sea States
- In office 1 September 2020 – 31 August 2024
- Preceded by: Maira Mora
- Succeeded by: Gustav Lindström

Poland Ambassador to Estonia
- In office 2010–2014
- Appointed by: Bronisław Komorowski
- President: Toomas Hendrik Ilves
- Preceded by: Tomasz Chłoń
- Succeeded by: Robert Filipczak

Personal details
- Born: 9 March 1971 (age 55) Warsaw
- Education: University of Warsaw
- Profession: diplomat

Grzegorz Marek Poznański (born 9 March 1971, Warsaw) is a Polish career diplomat and civil service member, ambassador to Estonia (2010–2014), Director General of the Permanent Secretariat of the Council of the Baltic Sea States (CBSS) in Stockholm (2020–2024).

== Life ==
Grzegorz Marek Poznański received a master's degree of international relations at the University of Warsaw. He has been studying also in Shanghai, Beijing, Taipei, National Defence University of Warsaw, National School of Public Administration, as well as United Nations Disarmament Fellowship course (2001).

He started his diplomatic career in 1997 at the Ministry of Foreign Affairs (MFA), specializing in security, disarmament, non-proliferation and arms export control issues. Between 2002 and 2006 he was working at the Permanent Mission of the Republic of Poland to the United Nations Office at Geneva. Next, was a member of the UNSG Panel of Governmental Experts on missiles (2007–2008). From 2007 to 2010 he was deputy director of the MFA European Policy Department and director of the Security Policy Department. Between 2010 and 2014 he served as Poland ambassador to Estonia. Following his post as a deputy director European Policy Department and, again, as director of Security Policy Department (2015–2017), he became deputy head of mission of the embassy in Vilnius, Lithuania. In June 2020 he was appointed Director General of the Council of the Baltic Sea States Secretariat as of 1 September 2020. He ended his term on 31 August 2024. Before that, he coordinated the Polish presidency of the council (2015–2016). Between 13 January 2025 and 30 April, he was Chargé d'affaires of the Embassy of Poland in Vilnius, Lithuania. In May 2026, he became deputy director of the MFA Eastern Department.

He speaks English, Russian and Chinese.

Besides diplomatic career, Poznański is also a fencer (épée, foil), member of Legia Warsaw sport club. He has been co-founder of Polish Fencing Club in Warsaw.

== Honours ==
- Order of the Cross of Terra Mariana, 1st class (Estonia, 2014)
- Cross of Merit of the Ministry of Defense of Estonia
