= Piotr Skwieciński =

Polish journalist

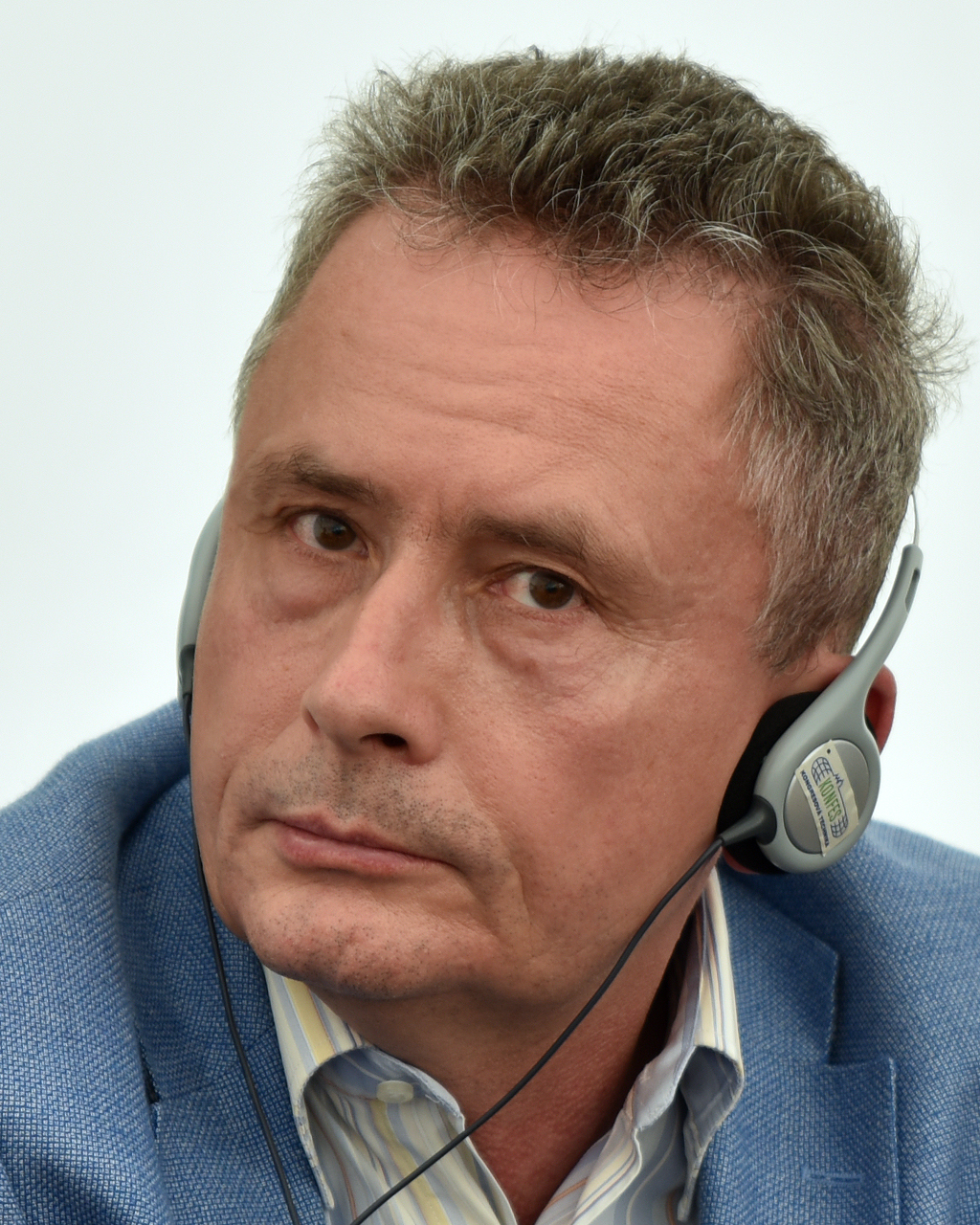
- Piotr Skwieciński (2022)

6th Poland Ambassador to Armenia
- In office 28 June 2023 – 2024
- Preceded by: Paweł Cieplak

Personal details
- Born: 1 May 1963 (age 63) Warsaw
- Parent(s): Mirosław Skwieciński; Wera Kamenz-Skwiecińska
- Education: University of Warsaw
- Profession: Journalist, diplomat, dissident

Piotr Skwieciński (born 1 May 1963, Warsaw) is a Polish journalist and diplomat, who served as Poland's ambassador to Armenia from 2023 to 2024.

== Life ==
Skwieciński graduated with a degree in history from the University of Warsaw (MA, 1989).

In the 1980s, he was active in the Solidarity underground movement and was member of the Independent Students' Association). On 16 December 1982, he was detained for political reasons, released after a couple of weeks. In 1989, he cooperated with the Citizens Parliamentary Party. In 1990, he was among co-founders of the Liberal Democratic Congress political party. In 1990s, he was member of the Republican League.

In 1990, he started his career as a journalist. First, he worked for "Życie Warszawy" daily. From 1994 to 1996 he was deputy head of the news program of the TVP1 "Wiadomości". Between 1996 and 1998 he worked for "Życie" daily. Afterwards, he was the head of the national editorial office of the Polish Press Agency (1998–2003). Between 2003 and 2006, he was the head of a section at the TV Puls. At that time he was also cooperating with other magazines, e.g. "Gazeta Polska", "Rzeczpospolita", "Dziennik". From 2006 to 2009 he was the President of the Polish Press Agency (PAP). Next, until 2010, he was advisor to Sławomir Skrzypek, the President of the National Bank of Poland. In 2010, Skwieciński joined "Rzeczpospolita" daily. In 2011, he was Rzeczpospolita's correspondent in Moscow, Russia. After his return, he continued his work for "Rzeczpospolita", as well as "Uważam Rze" weekly. From February 2013 to February 2019, he was journalist of the W Sieci weekly.

On 1 March 2019, he became the Director of the Polish Institute in Moscow. In 2020, the Minister of Culture and National Heritage appointed him to the Council of the Centre for Polish-Russian Dialogue and Understanding. In April 2022, following Russian invasion of Ukraine, Skwieciński was expelled from Russia among other 44 Polish diplomats. Since 22 August 2022, he was responsible for the dialogue with the Jewish diaspora as the deputy director of the Department of Public and Cultural Diplomacy, Ministry of Foreign Affairs.

On 18 April 2023, he was nominated Ambassador to Armenia. He began his mission on 28 June 2023, presenting his letter of credence to the President of Armenia Vahagn Khachaturyan. He ended his mission in 2024.

== Honours ==
- Meritorious Activist of Culture, Poland (2000)
- Knight's Cross of the Order of Polonia Restituta (2010)
- Medal of the Centenary of Regained Independence, Poland (2022)

== Books ==
- Romaszewscy. Autobiografia [The Romaszewski's. Autobiography], Wydawnictwo Trzecia Strona, Warszawa 2014, ISBN 978-83-645-2604-6.
- Kompleks Rosji [The Complex of Russia], Teologia Polityczna, Warszawa 2017, ISBN 978-83-628-8433-9.
- Koniec ruskiego miru? O ideowych źródłach rosyjskiej agresji[ The End of the Russian mir? On the ideological sources of Russian aggression], Teologia Polityczna, Warszawa 2022, ISBN 978-83-67065-27-6.
