= Dominika Krois =

Polish diplomat

Dominika Krois Ph.D.
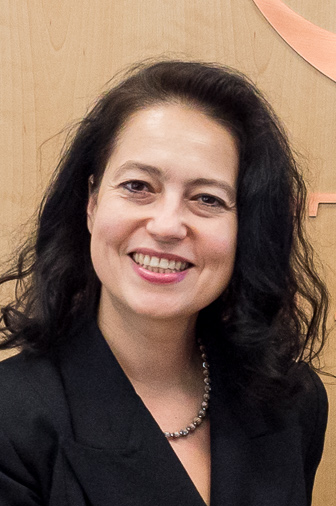

Poland Ambassador to the United Nations Office at Vienna
- In office November 2019 – July 2024
- Preceded by: Adam Bugajski
- Succeeded by: Marek Szczygieł

Personal details
- Born: 1972 (age 53–54)
- Education: Jagiellonian University
- Occupation: Diplomat, legal scholar

Dominika Anna Krois (born 1972) is a Polish civil servant, diplomat and legal scholar who served as a Permanent Representative of Poland to the United Nations Office at Vienna (2019–2024). Since 2024, she is the Representative and Director of the United Nations Office in Belgrade.

== Life ==
Krois graduated from law at the Jagiellonian University and received a Ph.D. in law at the same university in 2006, defending thesis International legal instruments against corruption. She has been also studying at the Diplomatic Academy of Vienna.

In 1999, she joined the Ministry of Foreign Affairs of Poland. She was working as Second Secretary for EU affairs at the Embassy in Berlin (2001–2005) and as First Secretary, Counsellor and First Counsellor at the Permanent Representation of Poland to the UN Office and International Organisations in Vienna, being responsible for issues of security, non-proliferation, terrorism and official development assistance (2006–2010). She was also a deputy chair of the Conference of the States Parties to the United Nations Convention against Transnational Organized Crime. At the MFA, Krois worked at the departments of the European Union, Legal and Treaty Affairs, and Foreign Policy Strategy and Planning. She was serving also as a member of the European External Action Service at the EU Delegation to the International Organisations in Vienna (2011–2015), and as the coordinator of the relations with OSCE, being in charge of the European security policy, and relations with Eastern Europe countries (2015–2019). On 10 October 2019, she was appointed the Permanent Representative of Poland to the UN Office and International Organisations at Vienna. She began her mission in November 2019, and ended in July 2024. In December 2024, she became Representative and Director of the United Nations Office in Belgrade, Serbia (UNOB).

Besides Polish, she speaks fluently English, French, and German. She is also communicative in Croatian, Spanish, and Russian.
