= Marian Cieplak =

Polish diplomat and statesman (1893–1996)

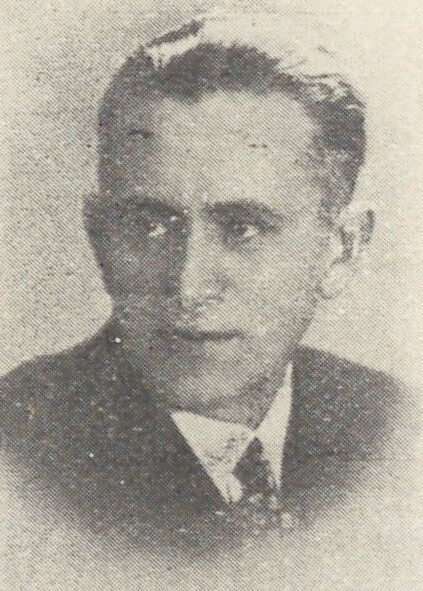
Marian Cieplak (93079510)

Marian Bogdan Cieplak (9 January 1893, Tarnopol, Austrian Poland (now Ternopil, Ukraine) – 19 July 1996 in Ocala, Florida, United States) was a Polish diplomat and statesman, recipient of many awards and decorations.

Member of the Sejm of 1, 2, 3, and 5 convocations of the Second Polish Republic.

Following World War II he lived in the US, where he performed various diplomatic functions for Poland and was active in American Polonia.

In 1991 he was pronounced honorary citizen of Turek.
