= Marek Szczygieł =

Polish diplomat

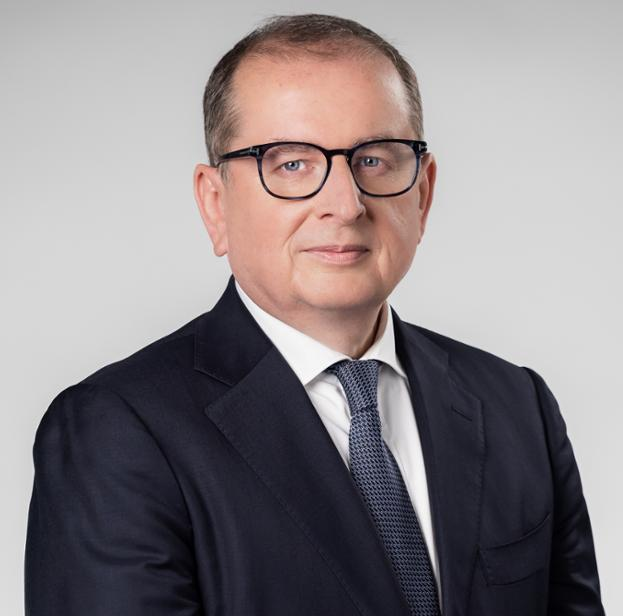
- Marek Szczygieł (2024)

Poland Ambassador to Romania
- In office 2011–2015
- Preceded by: Marcin Wilczek
- Succeeded by: Wojciech Zajączkowski

Poland Ambassador to the United Nations Office at Vienna
- Incumbent
- Assumed office 2025
- Preceded by: Dominika Krois

Personal details
- Born: 2 August 1969 (age 57) Poniatowa
- Education: Moscow State Institute of International Relations; Maria Curie-Skłodowska University
- Occupation: Diplomat

Marek Janusz Szczygieł (born 2 August 1969 in Poniatowa) is a Polish civil servant and diplomat, ambassador of Poland to Romania (2011–2015).

== Life ==
Szczygieł graduated from political science at the Moscow State Institute of International Relations (M.A., 1993), as well as from law at the Maria Curie-Skłodowska University in Lublin (M.A., 1994).

In 1993, he joined the Ministry of Foreign Affairs of Poland. He was desk officer for relations with Romania and Bulgaria, and later for relations with the Nordic states. Between 1995 and 2000, he served at the Embassy in Stockholm. Next, he was desk officer for relations with the Organization for Security and Co-operation in Europe (OSCE) and head of unit at the MFA Security Policy Department. In 2002, he was promoted deputy director of this Department. From 2004 to 2008, he was deputy head of mission of the Permanent Mission to the United Nations Office and the International Organizations in Vienna. Afterwards, he returned to his former post of the deputy director of the MFA Security Policy Department. In 2011, he was nominated ambassador to Romania, and began his mission on 28 June 2011. He finished his term on 14 August 2015. Next, he was working as director of the office of the OSCE High Commissioner on National Minorities. In March 2020, he became head of the European Union Monitoring Mission in Georgia and in October 2022, he led the European Union Monitoring Capacity to Armenia. In May 2025, he became acting Permanent Representative of Poland to the OSCE and United Nations in Vienna.

Besides Polish, he speaks fluently English, Swedish, and Russian. He is also communicative in French, and German.

In 2015, he was awarded by the president of Romania with Grand Cross of the National Order of Faithful Service.
