= Krzysztof Strzałka =

Polish diplomat

Krzysztof Strzałka Ph.D.
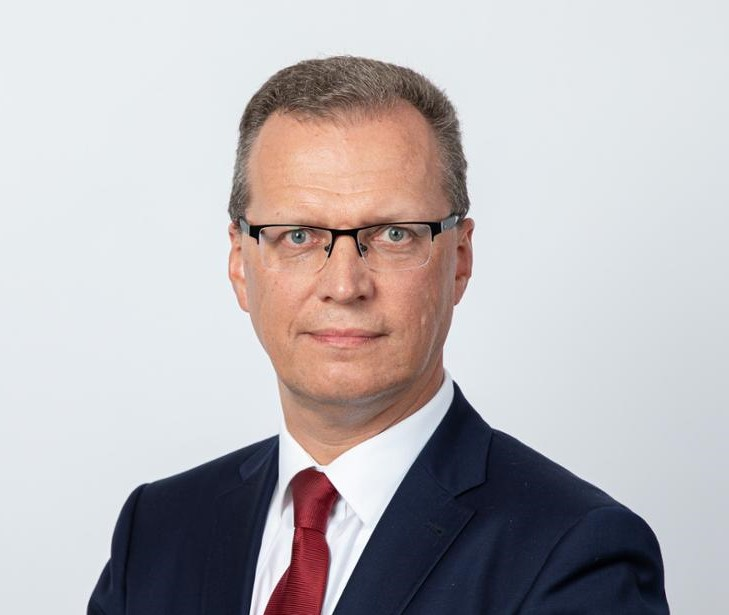

6th Poland Ambassador to Slovakia
- In office 11 September 2018 – 7 August 2023
- President: Andrzej Duda
- Preceded by: Leszek Soczewica
- Succeeded by: Maciej Ruczaj

Personal details
- Born: 1967 (age 58–59) Dębica
- Spouse: Iwona Strzałka
- Education: Jagiellonian University; Sapienza University of Rome
- Profession: Political scientist, university teacher, diplomat

Krzysztof Strzałka (born 1967, Dębica) is a Polish political scientist and diplomat, between 2018 and 2023 serving as an ambassador to Slovakia.

== Life ==
=== Education and scientific career ===
Strzałka graduated from political science at the Sapienza University of Rome and from history at the Jagiellonian University (both master's degree). He has also completed post-graduate studies in management and business at the Jagiellonian University. He has received NATO, the Foundation for Polish Science, the Lanckoroński Foundation scholarships. In 1999, he obtained his Ph.D. degree in humanities, presenting thesis on Italy–Poland relations between 1939 and 1945. From 2005, he has been working as an assistant professor at the Jagiellonian University, Institute of European Studies. He has been working also at the Polish Academy of Sciences, Institute of Political Studies. He authored several articles on history of diplomacy, public diplomacy, foreign affairs of the Holy See.

=== Diplomatic career ===
In 2000, he joined the Ministry of Foreign Affairs. From 2000 to 2005 he was the First Secretary at the Polish Embassy in Rome. Between 2006 and 2008 he was working at the MFA Department of Planning and Strategy of Foreign Policy and at the Department of Europe. From 2008 to 2012 he served as the Consul-General in Milan. From 2013 he worked at the Department of Cooperation with the Polish Diaspora and Poles Abroad, and as a deputy director at the Department of Public and Cultural Diplomacy (2016–2018).

In 2018, he was nominated Polish ambassador to Slovakia, later presenting his letter of credence to the President Andrej Kiska on 11 September 2018. He ended his term on 7 August 2023. He has been working in the Strategy Department of the Ministry of Foreign Affairs since 2024. On 1 January 2026, he was appointed to the highest rank in the Polish diplomatic service – titular ambassador. https://europeistyka.uj.edu.pl/aktualnosci/wiadomosci/-/journal_content/56_INSTANCE_n5f3IV1GxbGK/3458728/159893173

Besides Polish, he speaks fluently English, Italian and Slovak. He has also passive knowledge of French, Russian and Spanish languages.
