= Paweł Cieplak =

Polish diplomat

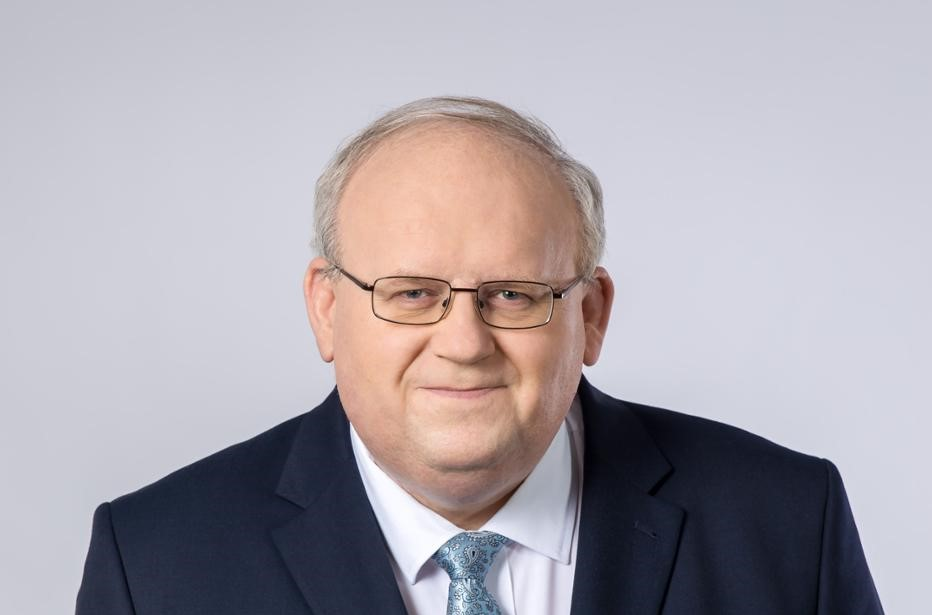

4th Poland Ambassador to Kazakhstan
- In office April 2007 – September 2010
- Preceded by: Władysław Jan Sokołowski
- Succeeded by: Jacek Kluczkowski

5th Poland Ambassador to Armenia
- In office February 2018 – 30 April 2023
- Preceded by: Jerzy Marek Nowakowski
- Succeeded by: Piotr Skwieciński

Personal details
- Born: 29 June 1966 (age 60) Warsaw
- Education: University of Warsaw
- Profession: Diplomat

Paweł Cieplak (born 29 June 1966, in Warsaw) is a Polish diplomat; ambassador to Kazakhstan (2007–2010) and Armenia (2018–2023).

== Life ==
Cieplak graduated from history at the University of Warsaw (MA, 1992). He has been studying also international relations at the Hoover Institution, Stanford University and EU studies at the European College in Łódź.

In 1991, he joined the Ministry of Foreign Affairs of Poland. Between September 1996 and July 1998 he was First Counsellor at the embassy in Riga, heading it as chargé d'affaires for four months. From August 1998 to September 2001 he was serving in Vilnius, also as chargé d'affaires (August 2000 – April 2001). Later, he was working at the MFA European Department. Between August 2005 and April 2007 he was at the embassy in Vilnius, again. In April 2007 he became ambassador to Kazakhstan. In September 2009, he was responsible for moving embassy from Almaty to the new capital in Astana. Ending his term in September 2010, Cieplak returned to MFA, working at the Bureau of Human Resources (2010–2011), Eastern Department (2011–2013), Department for Cooperation with Polish Diaspora and Poles Abroad (2014–2015), and back at the Eastern Department (2015–2017). In December 2017 he was nominated Poland ambassador to Armenia, presenting his letter of credence to the President Serzh Sargsyan on 8 February 2018. He ended his term on 30 April 2023.

In 1999, he was awarded with Officer's Cross of the Order of the Lithuanian Grand Duke Gediminas.
