= Matti Klinge =

Finnish historian (1936–2023)

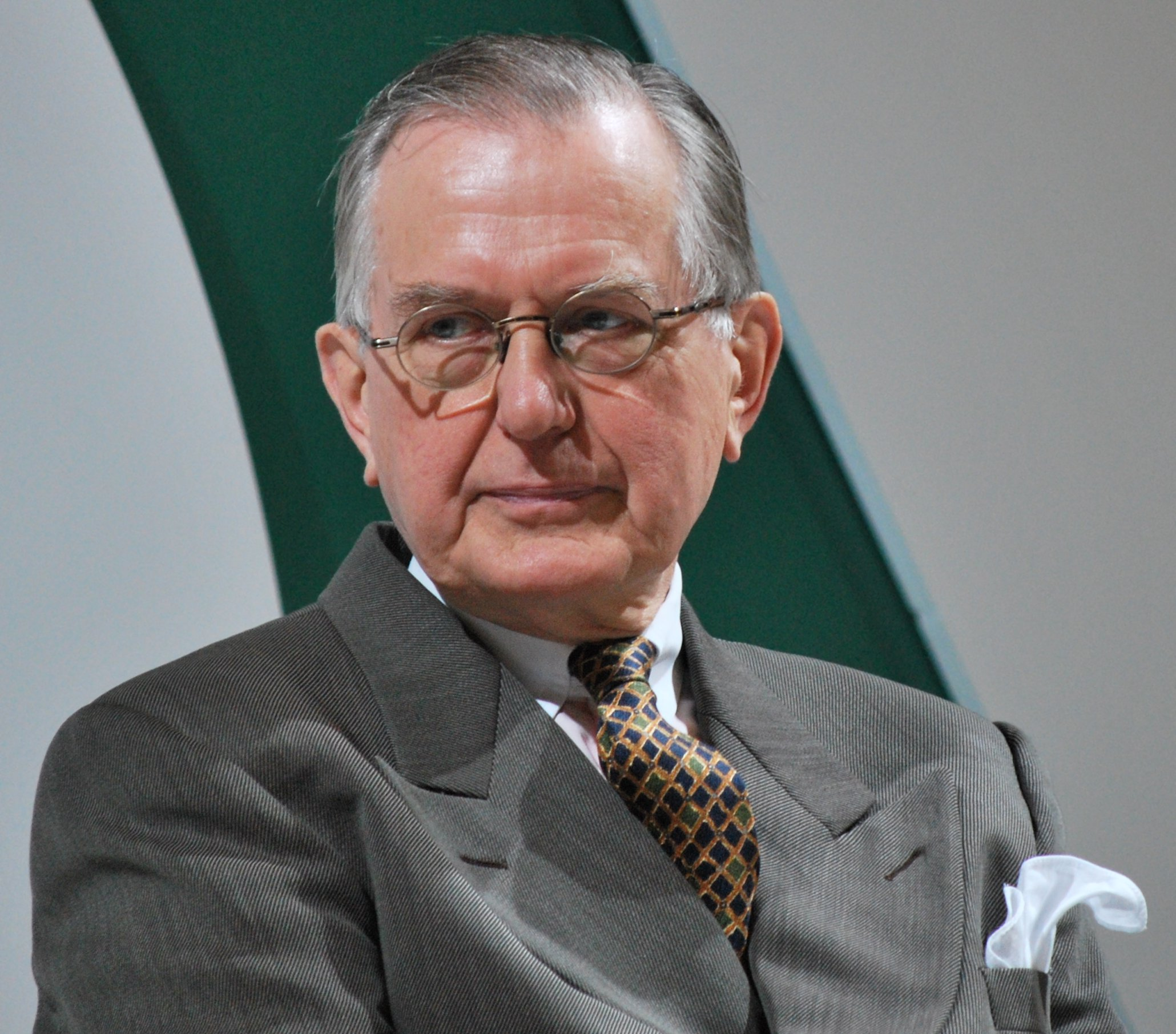
Klinge in 2008

Matti Klinge (31 August 1936 – 5 March 2023) was a Finnish professor and historian.

Klinge studied at the University of Helsinki and gained his Ph.D. in 1969. He later served as a visiting professor at the University of Paris (1970–1972) and held the Swedish Professorship of History at the University of Helsinki between 1975 and 2001. Klinge was one of the most prolific Finnish historians.

Kligne died in March 2023, at the age of 86.

== Honors ==
- Order of the White Rose of Finland (Finland, 1990)
- Order of the Lion of Finland (Finland, 1980)
- Legion of Honour (France, 2015)
- Order of Friendship (Russia, 2013)
- Order of the Polar Star (Sweden, 1996)

== See also ==
- "Matti Klinge". 375 Humanists. Helsinki: Faculty of Arts, University of Helsinki. 29 April 2015.
