= Artur Orzechowski =

Polish diplomat (born 1967)

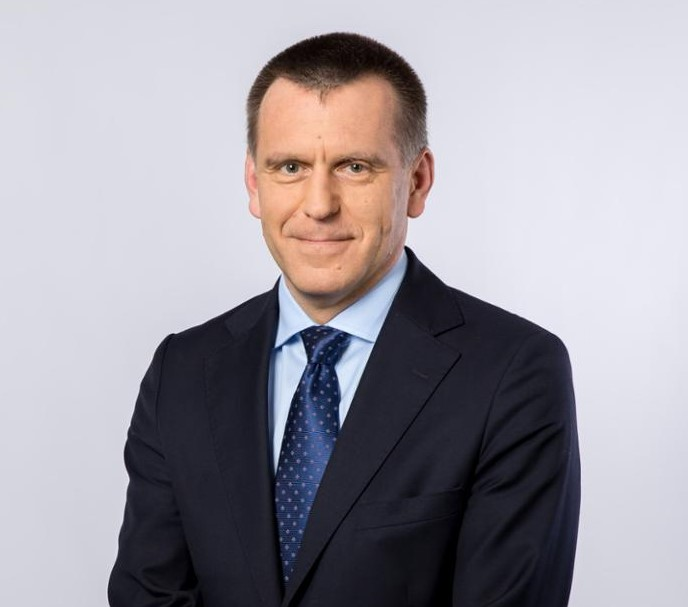

Poland Ambassador to Belgium
- In office 24 August 2016 – 30 April 2021
- Preceded by: Artur Harazim
- Succeeded by: Rafał Siemianowski

Poland Ambassador to Estonia
- Incumbent
- Assumed office April 2025
- Preceded by: Grzegorz Kozłowski

Personal details
- Born: 1967 (age 58–59)
- Education: Maria Curie-Skłodowska University; National School of Public Administration
- Profession: Diplomat

Artur Jan Orzechowski (born 1967) is a Polish diplomat serving as an ambassador to Belgium (2016–2021), and Estonia (since 2025).

== Life ==
Artur Orzechowski has graduated from Romance studies at the Maria Curie-Skłodowska University, Lublin, Poland and the National School of Public Administration.

In 1994, Orzechowski joined the Ministry of Foreign Affairs of Poland. He was holding directoral posts of the Department of the Americas (2008–2009) and the European Policy Department (2013–2016). He has been working at the consulate in Montreal, embassy in Washington, D.C. (head of political section, 2005–2007) and at Permanent Representation to NATO and Western European Union in Brussels (deputy head of mission, 2007–2008). On 24 August 2016 he was nominated Poland ambassador to Belgium. He presented his credentials on 30 August 2016. He ended his term on 30 April 2021. In December 2023, he was nominated deputy director of the MFA European Policy Department. In October 2024, he became Chargé d'affaires at the Embassy in Tallinn, and in April 2025, Ambassador to Estonia.

Besides Polish, he speaks English, French, Spanish, Italian and Portuguese languages.

== Honours ==
- Knight of the Ordre national du Mérite, France (2024)
- Order of the Cross of Terra Mariana, 3rd Class, Estonia (2025)
