= List of ambassadors of Poland to Finland =

Poland Ambassador to Finland
- Ambasador Rzeczypospolitej Polskiej w Finlandii
- Coat of arms of Poland
- Style: Mr. Ambassador (informal); His Excellency (diplomatic)
- Reports to: Polish Ministry of Foreign Affairs
- Seat: Helsinki, Finland
- Appointer: President of Poland
- Term length: No fixed term
- Website: Embassy of Poland, Finland

The Republic of Poland Ambassador to Finland is the Poland's foremost diplomatic representative in the Republic of Finland, and head of the Poland's diplomatic mission there.

== History ==
Diplomatic relations between Poland and Finland were established on February 7, 1920. The Embassy of Poland is located in the Helsinki suburb of Kulosaari and Honorary Consulates of Poland in Espoo, Jyväskylä, Kuopio, Tampere and Turku.

== List of ambassadors of Poland to Finland ==
=== Second Polish Republic ===
- 1918–1920: Mikołaj Himmelstjerna (chargé d’affaires)
- 1920–1922: Michał Sokolnicki (envoy)
- 1922–1927: Tytus Filipowicz (envoy)
- 1927–1928: Tomasz Sariusz-Bielski (chargé d’affaires)
- 1928–1935: Franciszek Charwat (envoy)
- 1936–1941: Henryk Sokolnicki (envoy)
- 1941–1942: Józef Weyers (chargé d’affaires)

January 18, 1942 – closure of the embassy due to breaking diplomatic relations

=== People's Polish Republic ===
- 1946–1947: Stefan Szumowski (envoy)
- 1947–1949: Jan Wasilewski (envoy)
- 1949–1950: Włodzimierz Umiastowski (chargé d’affaires)
- 1950: Feliks Petruczyński (envoy)
- 1950–1954: Kazimierz Krawczyński (chargé d’affaires)
- 1954–1957: Jan Lato
- 1957–1965: Edward Pietkiewicz
- 1965–1972: Aleksander Juszkiewicz
- 1972–1978: Adam Willmann
- 1978–1982: Włodzimierz Wiśniewski
- 1982–1983: Józef Fajkowski
- 1983–1984: Jan Załęski
- 1985–1990: Henryk Burczyk
- 1992–1995: Andrzej Potworowski
- 1996–2000: Józef Wiejacz
- 2000–2005: Stanisław Stebelski
- 2005–2007: Andrzej Szynka
- 2007: Stanisław Cios (chargé d’affaires)
- 2007–2011: Joanna Hofman
- 2011–2015: Janusz Niesyto
- 2015–2017: Przemysław Grudziński
- 2017: Tomasz Kozłowski (chargé d’affaires)
- 2017–2019: Jarosław Suchoples
- 2019: Marcin Tatarzyński (chargé d’affaires)
- 2019–2023: Piotr Rychlik
- 2023–2024: Andrzej Mojkowski (chargé d’affaires)
- since 2024: Tomasz Chłoń (chargé d’affaires)
