= Janiszew, Greater Poland Voivodeship =

Janiszew
- Village
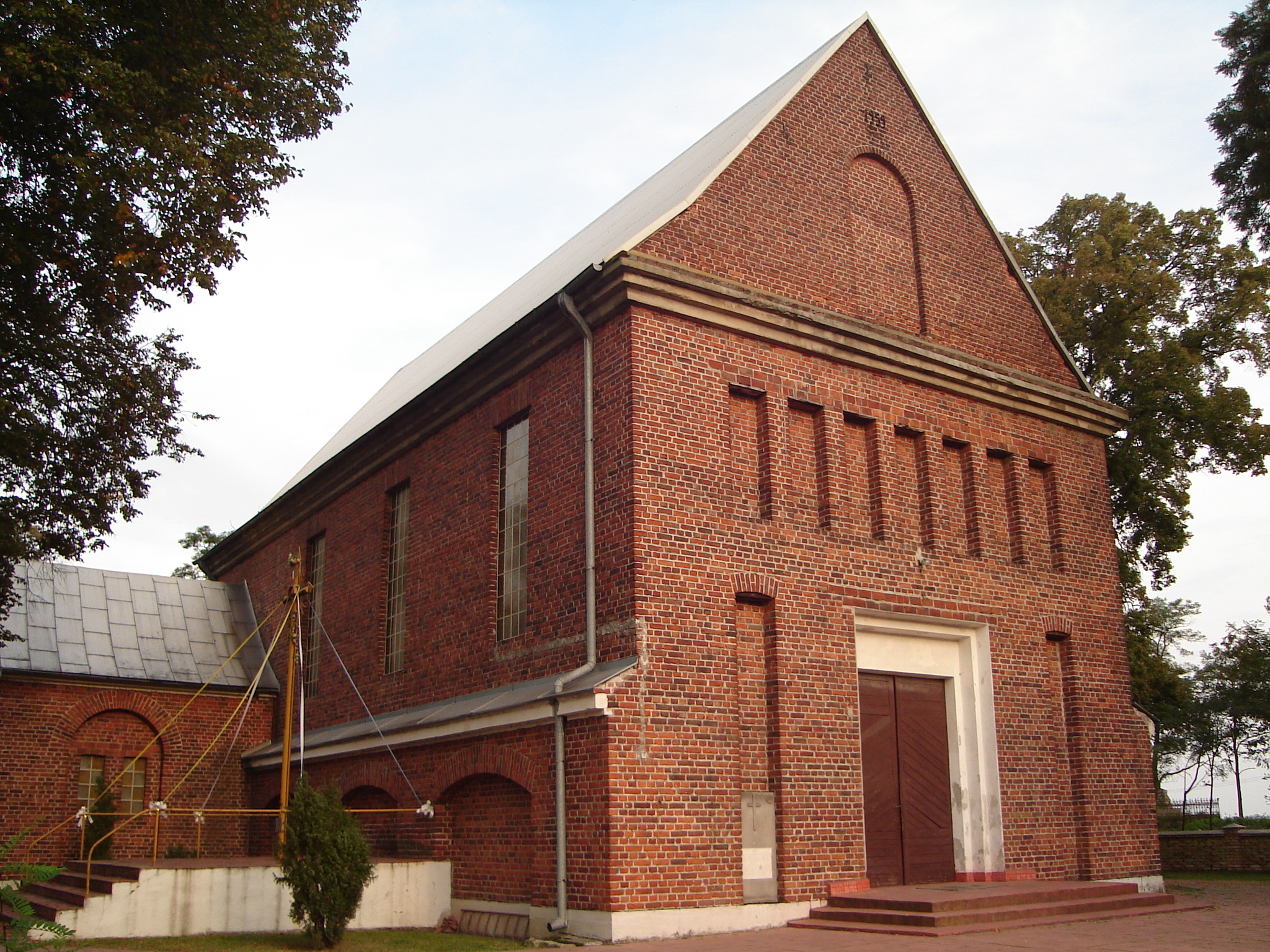
- Church in Janiszew

- Location within Poland
- Coordinates: 52°05′N 18°39′E
- Country: Poland
- Voivodeship: Greater Poland
- Powiat: Turek
- Gmina: Brudzew
- Established: 15th century

Government
  - Mayor (sołtys): Zdzisław Kaźmierczak
- Area: 7.17 km^{2} (2.77 sq mi)
- Population (2006): 285
  - Density: 40/km^{2} (100/sq mi)
- Time zone: UTC+1 (CET)
  - Summer (DST): UTC+2 (CEST)
- Postal code: 62-720
- Area code: +48 63
- Car Plates: PTU
- Website: www.janiszew.net

Janiszew [jaˈniʂɛf] is located in the centre of Brudzew administrative district of Poland, near the Koźmin strip of Adamów Brown Coal Mine, on a small river called Struga Janiszewska. The village lies on local road from Brudzew to Koźmin, about 10 kilometers from Turek, and 2 kilometers from Brudzew. Janiszew consists of the so-called Parcele, Poduchowne, Ostrów, and Stara Wieś of which only a giant hole of the strip mine remains today. The village adjoins Brudzew, Krwony, Głowy and Koźmin and is located about 100–105 meters above sea level.

The village of Janiszew has an area of 7.17 km^{2}. Cropland covers 6.15 km^{2}, of which 4.47 km^{2} are arable. The remaining 1.68 km^{2} is grassland and pastures. Areas covered by forests, ditches and roads total 0.12 km^{2}, while building areas amount to 0.10 km^{2}, and wasteland covers 0.11 km^{2}.

The village administrator (chair of village council) is Zdzisław Kaźmierczak, and the village council comprises also of Edward Oblizajek and Marek Włodarczyk. Among former administrators were: Marian Szymaniak, Stanisław Warach, Leonard Granos, Kazimierz Kubiak and Kazimierz Kubiak.

== Church ==
That church was pulled down and disassembled by the Nazi during the Second World War (1939-1945). After the war, there was a wooden makeshift church, and fifteen years after the war had ended, in the years 1958-1960 a new brick temple was erected, according to a project by civil engineer Wielichowski.
