= Dobrowska Foundation =

Land grant to Cistercians in Greater Poland

Church in Dobrów

Dobrowska Foundation, also known as the Dobrowszczyzna, was an anonymous or undocumented grant of part of private landed estates in Greater Poland to the Cistercian Order and its missionary efforts among the pagan Prussians. The name of the foundation comes from the village of Dobrów in the Greater Poland Voivodeship, Koło County, Gmina Kościelec, near the confluence of the Ner river with the Warta. The estate complex included, besides Dobrów, several other villages: Leszno, Rzuchów, Szadów, and Kwiatków.

The foundation is most commonly associated with the figure of the presumed Archbishop of Gniezno, blessed Bogumilus, often identified in literature with Archbishop Piotr Łabędź. According to some researchers, this archbishop was supposed to come from the knightly Leszczyc family, be a benefactor of the Cistercian Order, and occupy the Gniezno capital from 1187 to 1199. Afterwards, he allegedly built an hermitage in Dobrów, where he supposedly lived as a hermit for five years. Other scholars have placed Bogumilus' activities in the 11th century and did not associate him with the Dobrowska Foundation. In the latest studies, the prevailing opinion accepts his connection to this foundation and assumes that he held the Gniezno capital in the 1180s but is a different person from Archbishop Piotr.

== Historical background ==
The 11th and 12th centuries mark the period of the Piast dynasty's rule in the Polish lands. It was a time of the emergence and consolidation of both statehood and Christianity. The latter was served by the increasing influx of monks from Western Europe into Poland. Without them – both in the view of secular and ecclesiastical authorities – the process of civilizing and Christianizing the Polish lands would undoubtedly have proceeded much more slowly. Monks brought with them a wide range of knowledge in literature, architecture, agriculture, various crafts, and, above all, administration. Their activities laid the foundation for the structure of the Piast states during the period of territorial fragmentation.

From the mid-12th century, numerous Cistercian monasteries were founded in Polish territories (especially in Greater Poland, Pomerania, western Lesser Poland, and Silesia): Łekno (1153), Lubiąż (1163), Kołbacz (1173), Ląd (1173), Sulejów (1176), Wąchock (1179), Koprzywnica (1185), Oliwa (1186), Mogiła (1222), Henryków (1227), and others. Somewhat later, a few Cistercian convents were established (Trzebnica (1203), Ołobok (1211), and Owińska (1250)). The composition of the convents was predominantly foreign. The Cistercians in Lesser Poland originated from Morimond in Burgundy (now in Champagne), and until the late Middle Ages, they were mainly French and Italian. In the convents in other regions, there were mostly Germans – in the Greater Poland's Łekno, Ląd, or Obra (1240) (branches of the Cistercian abbey in Altenberg near Cologne), only citizens of Cologne were admitted, which often gave later researchers a reason to exaggerate the role of Cistercian monasteries in the Germanization of the Polish borderlands beyond the Oder River.

The monasteries constituted an element of the feudalization of political life in Polish territories, with the importance of convents growing based on increasingly large land grants. Benedictine abbeys and hermitages, existing here in the 11th century, in the next century began to give way to orders that (like the Cistercians) combined pastoral work with economic activity and were able to use grants to build increasingly large land estates, thereby expanding the church infrastructure serving both the Church and secular state institutions.

With the strengthening of Christianity in Polish territories, the issue of evangelizing the pagan peoples inhabiting the lands to the east and northeast of Poland arose, namely the Lithuanians, Yotvingians, and Prussians. On the one hand, it was about territorial expansion and defense of one's own lands, which were the target of raiding expeditions by neighbors, which was the responsibility of local rulers (such as the Masovian dukes). On the other hand, it was about spreading Christianity, which was the responsibility of the bishops of border dioceses. However, since the diocesan bishops did not have the necessary tools (in the form of properly trained missionaries), the duty of evangelizing "pagans" was shifted to monasteries, bishops, and wandering preachers (including Adalbert of Prague, Gilo of Toucy, and Bernard the Spaniard) who engaged in spreading the faith among non-Christians.

== History of the foundation ==
No documents directly related to the original grant have survived, so the knowledge of it comes from mentions in later documents. In a privilege issued on 29 June 1232, by Duke Władysław Odonic for the benefit of the abbot of Sulejów, Bogufał (Boguchwał), there is a testimony from Bishop Christian of Prussia confirming that the church in Dobrów, along with all its endowment (including Leszno, Rzuchów, Szadów, and Kwiatków with their tithe income, fisheries, and also tithes from these and fourteen other villages), was endowed by Archbishop Bogumilus for disposal, according to the will of the general chapter of the Cistercian Order.

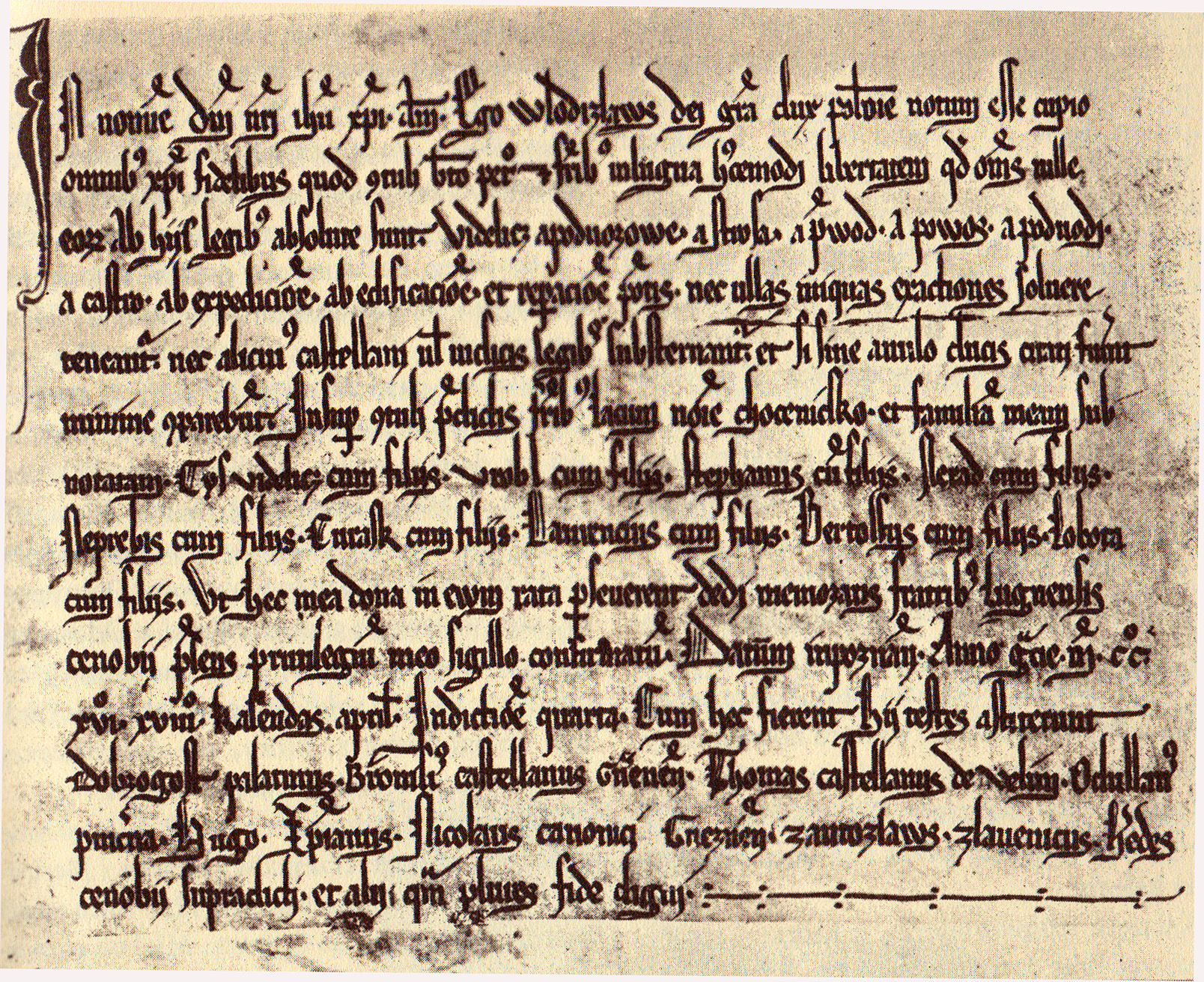
Wladyslaw Odonic's document for the Cistercians of Sulejów from the year 1232

In the document under discussion, Bishop Christian, in the presence of Duke Władysław, Archbishop Pełka, and nine witnesses, conveyed the aforementioned foundation into the hands of the abbot of the Cistercians from Sulejów, still with the reservation of the ultimate authority of the general chapter, with legal force after his own death. Duke Władysław sanctioned the grant, mentioning, among other things, the right to fishing and beaver trapping on the Warta and Ner rivers, as well as exemption from various burdens to the state, thus confirming the grants for Dobrów made by his ancestors – Mieszko III, Władysław III, and Odon of Poznań.

Supplementing this document is a privilege from Duke Casimir I of Kuyavia dated 25 May 1252. It was issued on the occasion of Sulejów's transition under the rule of this duke and confirmed the grant to the abbey. The purpose of the foundation was to carry out missions among the Prussians. Its execution was the responsibility of the bishop, but based on the influence from the endowment, which the Cistercians were to ensure.

The Dobrowska Foundation was managed by the monks from Sulejów until 1285, when it was taken over by the Cistercians from Byszew, who were transferred from Szpetal due to Prussian raids. The estate remained in their hands for only three years. Already in 1288, at the urging of Duke Przemysł of Inowrocław, the entire foundation was exchanged for tithes from sixteen villages in the Nakło castellania. The reason for the exchange, which must have caused significant losses to the monastery, is not clear. Presumably, the Cistercians from Byszew were afraid of a dispute with the powerful Sulejów abbey (by leaving Szpetal, they resigned from their missionary function in Prussia, and thus formally lost the right to use the foundation). Such an exchange was intended to sever all ties between the monastery and Dobrowszczyzna.

Now the foundation – no longer being a foundation, in fact – came into the possession of Archbishop of Gniezno Jakub Świnka. However, he did not enjoy the acquisition for long, as the fears of the Cistercians from Byszew proved to be well-founded. Sir Sławęta from Janiszewo, claiming to be a descendant of the closest relatives of the archbishop-founder and the patron of the church in Dobrów, asserted his claims to the property based on the right of proximity. It is likely that the influential Leszczyc family, to which Sławęta probably belonged, continued to exercise oversight over the fulfillment of the foundation conditions established by Bogumilus. The fact that Sławęta's claims were not groundless is evidenced by the Archbishop Świnka partially relinquishing Dobrów (up to the Warta river) and Szadów, as well as tithes from five villages. In return, Sławęta pledged not to disturb the archbishop anymore and renounced the remaining claims. This agreement was approved in the spring of 1299 by Duke Władysław of Kuyavia.

== Doubts and attempts to explain the mystery ==
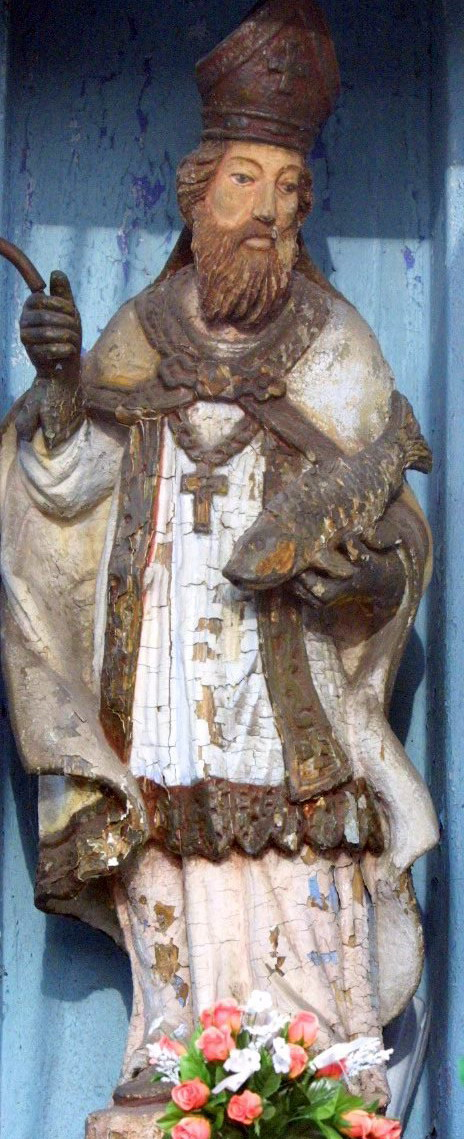
Blessed Bogumił, a chapel in Koźmin

The doubts primarily concern the identity of the founder, Archbishop Bogumilus, and for a long time, the authenticity of the document from 1232 known only from a 14th-century copy was also controversial.

Regarding Archbishop Bogumilus, tradition holds that he became Archbishop of Gniezno around 1167 but resigned after a few years and died as a hermit in 1182. However, this chronology is not supported by any contemporary sources. Meanwhile, the Świętokrzyskie Chronicle states: 1092 – Archbishop Bogumylus died, which seemed to indicate that Bogumilus lived in the 11th century rather than the 12th. The 12th-century manuscript does not cast doubt on the authenticity of the record, but it also lacks any confirmation. Jan Długosz's account, although providing the exact date of death (19 August 1092), but changing the name of the archbishop to Petrus, is not considered a reliable document by older researchers; it is now presumed that the name Piotr could have been a Christian name of Bogumilus preserved until Długosz's time through currently unknown sources. However, such a church dignitary could have lived both at the end of the 11th century and at the end of the next century. If Archbishop Bogumilus mentioned in the 1232 document lived and worked in the 11th century, he could not have been the founder of Dobrowszczyzna. This is obviously due to the fact that the first Cistercians arrived in Poland in the years 1140–1150. Some researchers argue that the right of proximity in the case of Sławęta from Janiszew (which was recognized both by Archbishop Jakub Świnka and Duke Władysław Łokietek) seems to speak in favor of Bogumilus, the 12th-century founder. They also point to a document from 1299 proving that Dobrów was the hereditary property of Bogumilus, not of the archdiocese.

Tadeusz Wojciechowski, who supports the 11th-century version of Bogumilus, speculated that a part of the narrative in Odonic's document from 1232 contains, alongside credible and verifiable data, invented or rather unwittingly false information. Assuming that Bogumilus lived in the 11th century, Wojciechowski conducts an analysis of the historical facts contained in Odonic's document, as follows:

1. Bogumilus was an archbishop.
2. Twelve years before his death, he resigned from his office due to persecution.
3. After resigning, he became a hermit in a Camaldolese hermitage.

Regarding the first point, disputing with Wojciechowski, other authors explain that the archbishopric was confirmed by the date of death (1092).

Regarding the second point, it can be shown that in the years 1080–1090, during the last decade of Bogumilus from the 11th century, another archpastor named Henryk ruled the Gniezno cathedral, while in the 12th century, there is no parallel evidence of the resigning prelate's life and activities. (Note: All indications are that T. Wojciechowski did not have complete sources.)

And finally, regarding the third point, concerning the alleged "Camaldolese," who were actually hermits, it is known that they existed in Poland in the 11th century (they even had their monastery in Kazimierz, located 10 kilometers from Dobrów), but in the 12th century, there were no longer present in Poland. Therefore, it follows that Bogumilus could not have been a hermit in the 1190s.

Adding that the character of the miracles attributed to him indicates an 11th-century origin of the legend of St. Bogumilus, Wojciechowski insisted on his version of the archbishop's life, attributing the foundation to the ancestors of Władysław Odonic: All the liberties that my ancestors, the memorable dukes of Poland – Mieszko, my grandfather, Władysław, my uncle, and Odon, my father, granted to the church in Dobrów, including all its possessions and inhabitants, I hereby renew and confirm (document from 1232).

Following Władysław Semkowicz, Stanisław Kozierowski identified Bogumilus with Petrus (Piotr) according to the key – the given name Bogumilus, the monastic name Piotr – who would have acted in the years 1187–1199, been a friend of Wincenty Kadłubek, and a benefactor of the Cistercians from Łękno and Ląd. He argued that the church (not a monastery or hermitage) was founded by Odonic's ancestors, while the foundation (i.e., the goods and tithes for the mission in Prussia) was the work of Bogumilus Piotr. The identity of both figures would also be indicated by the similar generosity of Archbishop Piotr towards the Łękno convent, and the incomprehensible – considering his merits – lack of memory among descendants of a figure as saintly and generous as the 11th-century Petrus. Moreover, the Leszczyc family – as claimed by Paprocki, Bielski, and Okolski – had in their genealogical tradition an archbishop named Piotr, whose memory later faded away. There is no doubt in the church tradition where the archbishop appears as Bogumilus Piotr.

An indirect argument in favor of the theory of Bogumilus-Piotr was that the name Bogumilus also appears in a 14th-century interpolation of another document dated to 1234, which originally contained the name of Archbishop Wincenty of Niałek (1220–1232). This fact led Henryk Łowmiański to speculate that it was in the 14th century that the name Bogumilus was tendentiously inserted into the document of 29 June 1232, in place of the name Piotr. However, this hypothesis did not hold up. All doubts about the authenticity of Władysław Odonic's privilege were dispelled when the original document, consistent with the known copies, was found. (Note: The discovery itself took place in 1939, but for a long time, the information about it did not make its way into the discussion about Bogumilus and the Dobrowska Foundation.)

Despite the clarification of doubts regarding the act of 1232, the figure of Archbishop Bogumilus remains mysterious, although the scope of considerations has narrowed. Wojciechowski's hypothesis is definitively rejected, as there is no evidence that the Bogumilus who died in 1092 (likely an authentic figure) had to resign from his office in favor of Henryk, and particularly there is no basis for considering the narrative of the 1232 document unreliable and identifying the mentioned Bogumilus with his namesake from the 11th century. (Note: Labuda presented a detailed critique of Wojciechowski's arguments, pointing out errors in his analysis of documents related to the Dobrowska Foundation. Most notably, Labuda demonstrated that Wojciechowski's hypothesis relied almost exclusively on his own conjectures without proper source-based evidence.) In light of the latest research, the hypothesis of Bogumilus-Piotr is also doubtful. Documents regarding the reform of the monastery at Wrocław's Ołbin indicate that Archbishop Piotr came from the Łabędź family, which is difficult to reconcile with Bogumilus' almost certain affiliation with the Leszczyc family. Currently, the most popular theory is that Bogumilus, from the Dobrowska Foundation, held the archbishopric in Gniezno in the 1180s as the predecessor of Archbishop Piotr from the Łabędź family.

== Summary and conclusions ==
The exact date of the establishment of the Dobrowska Foundation is not known. Neither the document from 1232 nor later ones provide this information. If the latest conclusions regarding the person of Bogumilus are correct, the foundation must have occurred in the 1180s. It seems that the foundation aimed to continue the Prussian mission. This is evidenced by the establishment of the Cistercian mission at Hospitale sancti Gothardi (later Szpetal) by the magnate from Kujawy, Bogusza Miecławic of the Doliwa family, on the right bank of the Vistula, opposite Włocławek, which, however, ended in failure. Prussian raids at that time often crossed the Vistula and reached the heart of Mazovia and Kuyavia. Szpetal itself was twice devastated (in 1242 and 1243), and some of the monks were massacred.

The Prussian mission was initiated by St. Adalbert in 997. Later, in the 11th and 12th centuries, it was carried out ineffectively by the Polish episcopate without much commitment. The mission was revived by the Cistercians from Łękno in 1204, following letters from Pope Innocent III urging the Polish episcopate and Duke Władysław Odonic to support the Cistercians. Given the established dating, it can be concluded that either the foundation had nothing to do with the mission in Prussia (contrary to the documents from 1232 and 1252), or that the Prussian mission was carried out by the monks from Łękno at the end of the 12th century under the patronage of Archbishop Bogumilus, independently of papal directives.

The timing of the transfer of Dobrowszczyzna to Christian is unknown. The Odonic document only mentions that it occurred after the death of Bogufał, and that Christian held Dobrów before becoming a bishop, which certainly happened before 1215.

The Prussian mission did not bring success to Christian. The emergence (after 1226) of a strong competitor in the form of the Teutonic Order led to the swift abandonment of the mission, and thus the key to Dobrowszczyzna once again came under the jurisdiction of the general chapter of the Cistercians. When the general chapter allowed (or rather ordered) Bishop Christian – at the behest of Abbot Willerm – to resign Dobrów in favor of the Sulejów convent, it did so not to enlarge the already extensive possessions of Sulejów "for disposition according to the will of the general chapter", but to lay the foundations for a new monastery to continue the mission in Prussia. This would explain the absence of Dobrów in known inventories of Sulejów's assets.

The establishment of the new monastery was realized in 1285 through a combination, by annexing Dobrów to the Byszew (later Koronowo) convent as compensation for the punitive transfer of some monks from Sulejów to this monastery. Since Dobrowszczyzna became the main endowment of the poor monastery, the monks of Byszew-Koronowo claimed that Bogumilus was their founder. In reality, the monks of Byszew wanted to get rid of the troublesome endowment as quickly as possible, which they succeeded in doing after only three years.

The final act closing the Dobrowszczyzna case was the aforementioned document signed by Władysław Łokietek in 1299, approving the division of the assets between Sławęta from Janiszew and Bishop Świnka representing the Gniezno metropolis before the princely court.

The Dobrowska Foundation, regardless of the identity of its founder, was a significant endowment among the donations to Cistercian monasteries in Greater Poland, both in the early period – as a base for the Prussian mission – and later, when it became part of the Sulejów estate and the financial basis of the Byszew-Koronowo monastery. Its decline and the return of assets to private hands practically severed the connection between Dobrowszczyzna and the mission of spreading Christianity among the Prussians. The Teutonic Order was to take its place.

== In culture ==
Jadwiga Żylińska's attempt to explain the mystery of the Dobrowska Foundation and Archbishop Bogumilus is not scholarly but literary in nature, as presented in the novel The Golden Spear (Polish: Złota włócznia).

== Bibliography ==
- Cyranowski, Jan (1926). Żywot Błogosławionego Bogumiła, arcybiskupa gnieźnieńskiego. Poznań.
- Dobosz, Józef (2002). Monarchia i możni wobec Kościoła w Polsce do początku XIII wieku. Poznań. ISBN 83-7177-110-X.
- Gąsiorowski, Andrzej (1977). U progów podziałów stanowych. Warsaw.
- Gruszka, Piotr (1972). "Cystersi na Pomorzu i w Wielkopolsce". Zeszyty Historyczne Uniwersytetu Gdańskiego. Gdańsk.
- Grzesik, Ryszard (1996). "Piotr II". Słownik Starożytności Słowiańskich. Vol. VIII, part 2. pp. 512–513.
- Korytkowski, Jan (1888). Arcybiskupi gnieźnieńscy: Prymasowie i metropolici polscy od roku 1000 aż do roku 1821, czyli do połączenia arcybiskupstwa gnieźnieńskiego z biskupstwem poznańskim. Vol. I. Poznań.
- Kozierowski, Stanisław (1926). Leszczyce i ich plemiennik arcybiskup św. Bogumił z Dobrowa. Poznań.
- Maciejewski, Jacek (2003). Episkopat polski doby dzielnicowej, 1180-1320. Tow. Nauk. Societas Vistulana. ISBN 83-88385-28-3.
- Labuda, Gerard (2004). Szkice historyczne X-XI wieku: z dziejów organizacji Kościoła w Polsce we wczesnym średniowieczu. Poznań. ISBN 83-7177-244-0.
- Samsonowicz, Henryk (1976). Historia Polski do roku 1795. Warsaw: Wydawnictwa Naukowe i Pedagogiczne.
- Samsonowicz, Henryk (1978). "Konrad I Mazowiecki". Poczet królów i książąt polskich. Warsaw: Czytelnik. pp. 178–185.
- Wojciechowski, Tadeusz (1952). Szkice historyczne XI wieku. Cracow.
- Nowacki, J. (1934). Opactwo św. Gotarda w Szpetalu pod Włocławkiem zakonu cysterskiego. Gniezno.
