= Cichowski =

Cichowski, feminine: Cichowska, is a habitational Polish surname for someone from a place called Cichowo or Cichów. Notable people with the surname include:

- Edward Joseph Cichowski (1912–1984), birth name of Edward J. York, American United States Air Force colonel
- Gene Cichowski (born 1934), American football player
- Kazimierz Cichowski (1887–1937), Polish-Soviet communist activist and politician
- Mikołaj Cichowski (1598–1669), Polish theologian
- Tom Cichowski (1944–2015), American football player

== See also ==
- Cichocki
