= Trzęśniew =

- Village
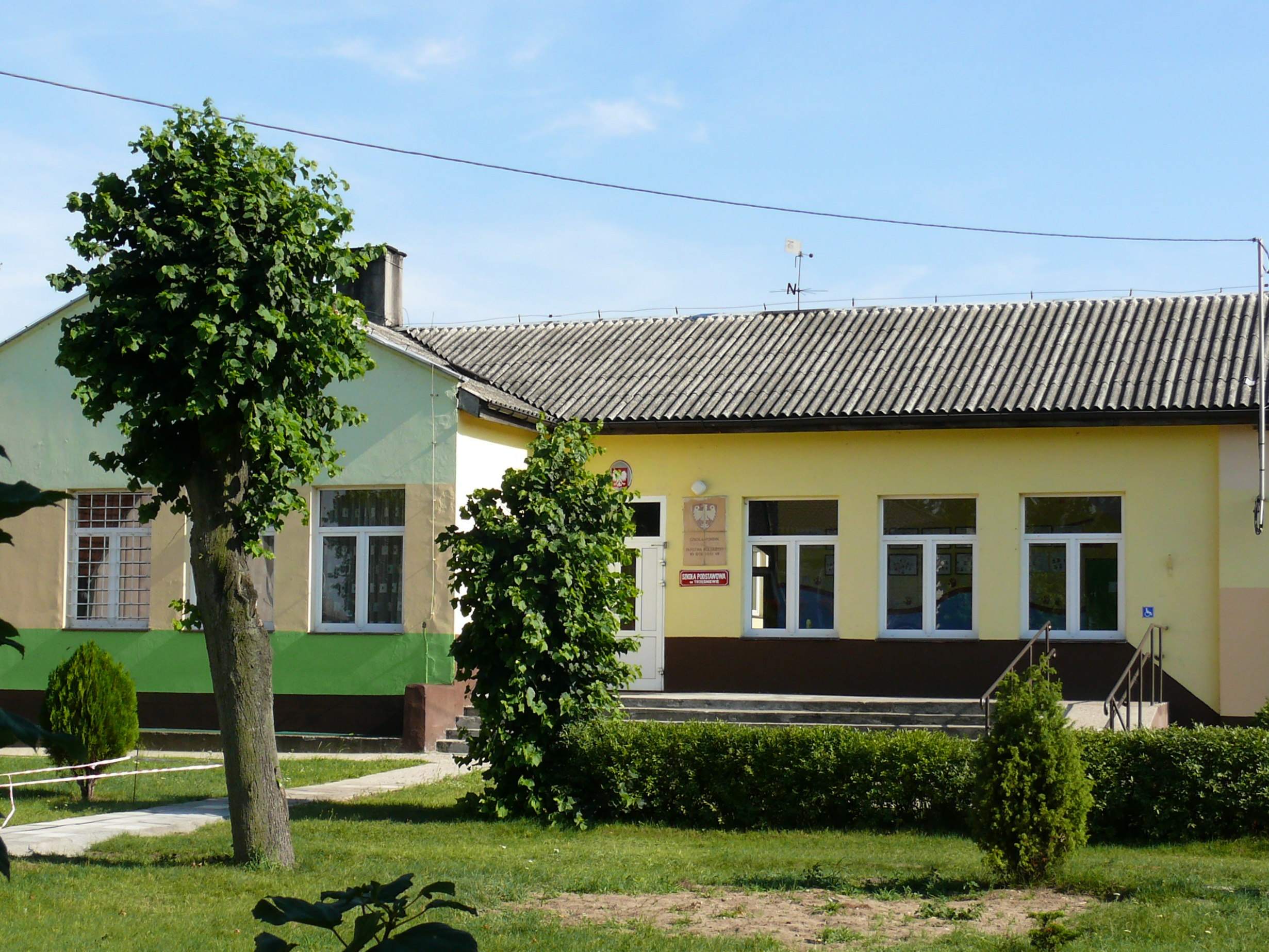
- Elementary school in Trzęśniew

- Location within Poland
- Coordinates: 52°12′N 18°30′E
- Country: Poland
- Voivodeship: Greater Poland
- County: Koło
- Gmina: Kościelec

Population
  - Total: 280
- Time zone: UTC+1 (CET)
  - Summer (DST): UTC+2 (CEST)
- Vehicle registration: PKL

Trzęśniew [ˈtʂɛ̃ɕɲɛf] is a village in the administrative district of Gmina Kościelec, within Koło County, Greater Poland Voivodeship, in central Poland. Trzęśniew lies approximately 6 kilometres (4 mi) north-west of Kościelec, 10 km (6 mi) west of Koło, and 111 km (69 mi) east of the regional capital Poznań.
