= Bogumilus =

Archbishop of Gniezno and monk

His Excellency Bogumił z Dobrowa
- Archbishop of Gniezno
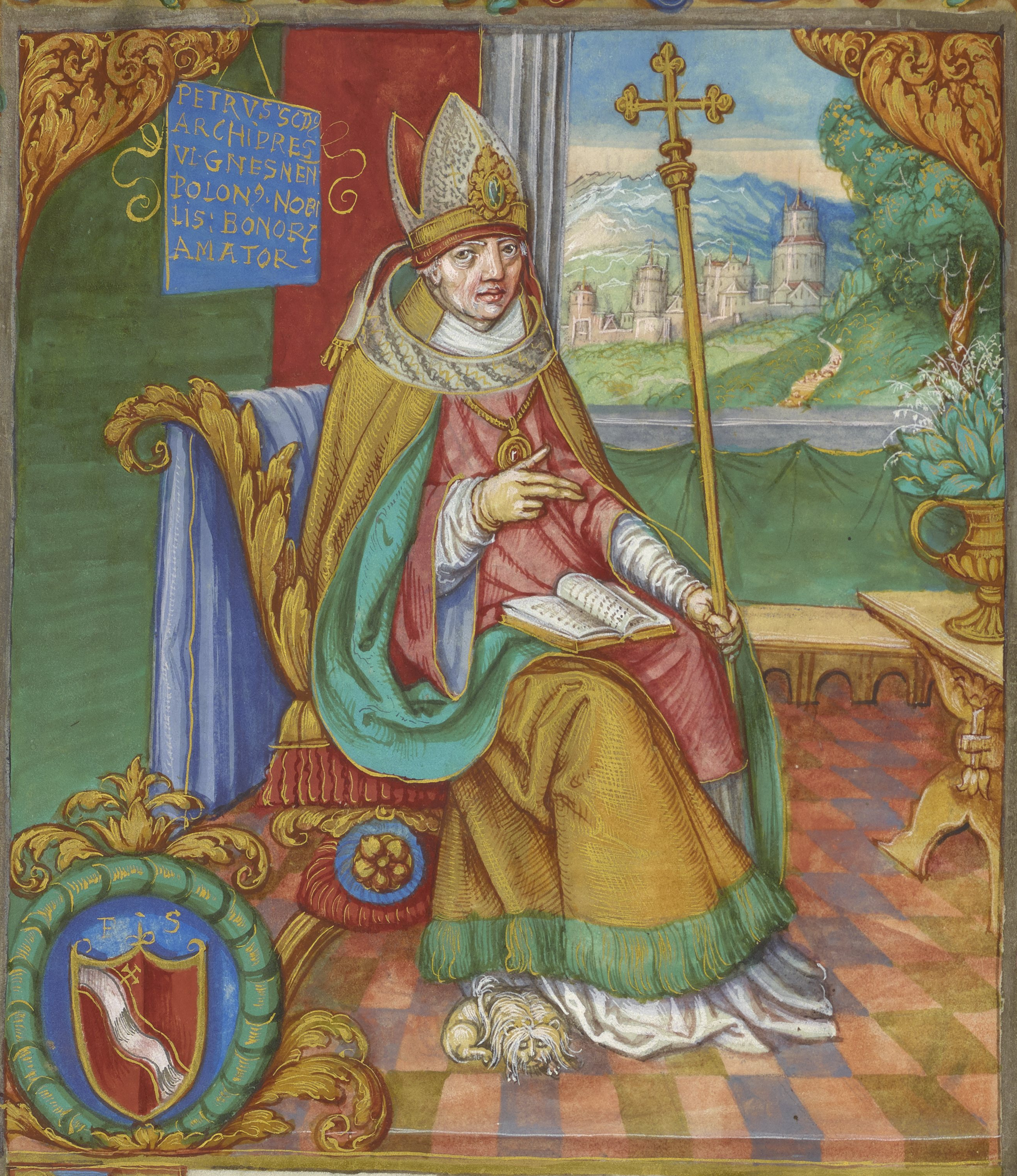
- Church: Roman Catholic
- Archdiocese: Gniezno
- Installed: after 1180
- Term ended: before 1190
- Predecessor: Zdzisław I
- Successor: Piotr Łabędź

Personal details
- Born: 1135?
- Died: 1204?
- Coat of arms: Bogumił z Dobrowa's coat of arms

Bl. Bogumilus (Bogumił)

Archbishop of Gniezno
- Born: Dobrów, Poland?
- Died: Uniedow, Poland?
- Venerated in: Roman Catholic Church
- Beatified: 27 May 1925 by Pope Pius XI
- Major shrine: relics in Collegiate Church of the Assumption of the Blessed Virgin Mary, Uniejów, Poland stole is kept in Archcathedral Basilica of St. Peter and St. Paul, Poznań, Poland
- Feast: 10 June
- Attributes: Bishop holding a fish
- Patronage: Roman Catholic Archdiocese of Gniezno, Poland

Bogumilus, in Polish Bogumił Piotr, (also known as Bogimilus and Theophilus) was Archbishop of Gniezno and a hermit.

== Life ==
Bogumilus and his twin brother, Boguphalus, were born into a noble family in about 1135 at Dobrów, Poland. They studied in Paris, France. Having completed his studies Bogumilus was ordained a priest near Dobrów. His uncle, who was the Archbishop of Gniezno, made him the chancellor of Gniezno. Bogumilus succeeded his uncle as Archbishop of Gniezno in 1167. Bogumilus founded a Cistercian abbey at Koronowo.

He resigned his see in 1172, possibly due to opposition by his clergy to what they viewed as his excessive strictness. Bogumilus then joined the Camaldolese hermits at Uniedow, Poland, where he remained until his death. While on his deathbed, it is believed that Bogumilus saw a vision of the Virgin Mary and Child, surrounded by a throng of angels, who were inviting him to heaven.

== Legacy and veneration ==
The cult and veneration of Bogumilus began almost immediately after his death, especially in Eastern Poland. Many people prayed for his intercession for things such as health, good livestock and a good catch while fishing. When they were answered, many faithful visited his tomb and it became a place for local pilgrimage. Yet it was not until 1625 that the formal process of beatification began under the Primate of Poland, Archbishop Maciej Łubieński.

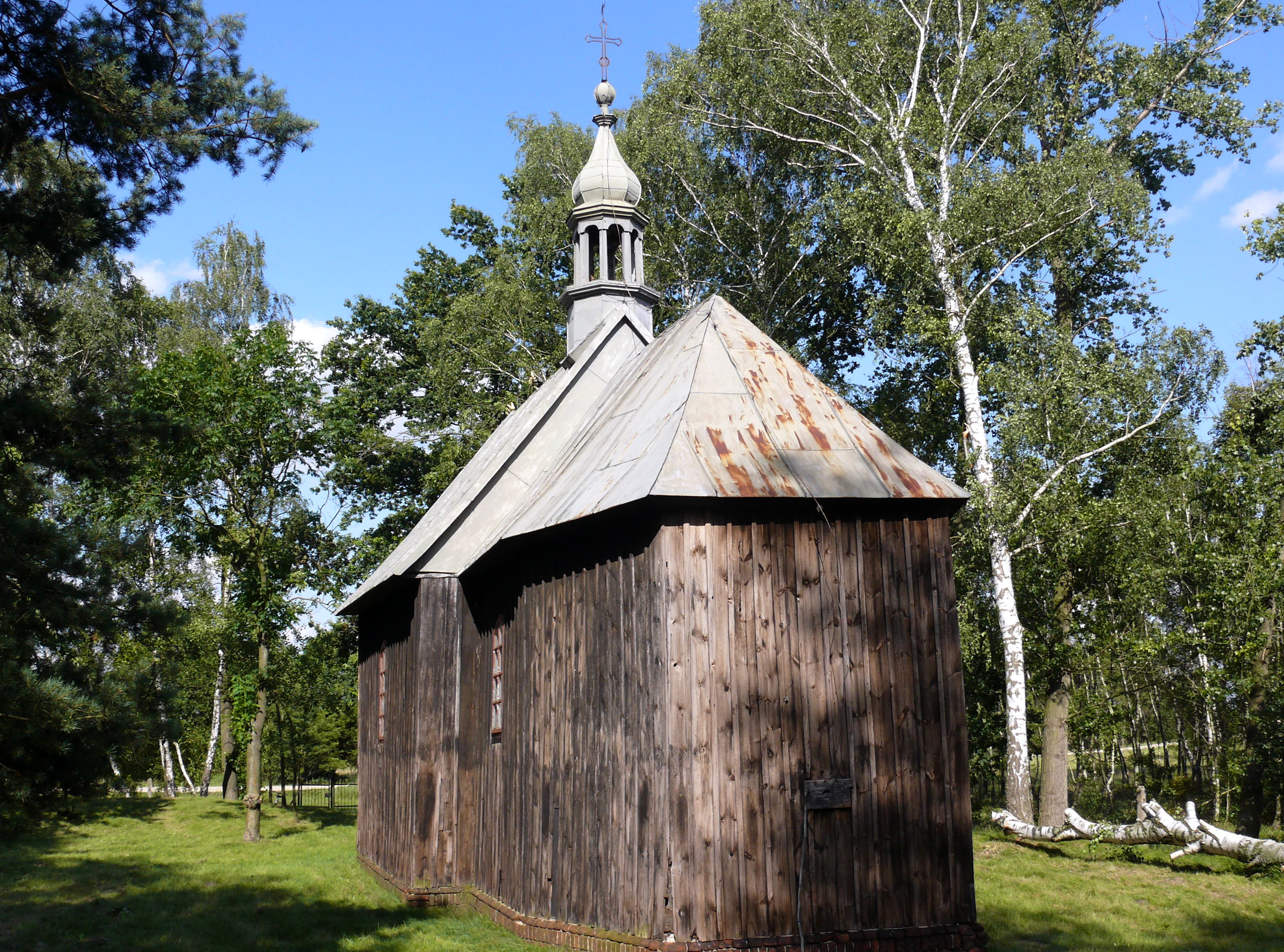
Chapel of blessed Bogumił, Dobrów

The files were sent to Rome in 1651, however the process was never completed as the Book of Miracles, which was in the hands of a Count, by the name of Sebastian Głębocki, was burned at his court in Głębokie, Kruszwica. In 1788 a small wooden chapel dedicated to Bogumilus was built, in the wetlands of the Rivers Warta and Teleszyny, near Dobrów, and still stands until this day. The process of beatification would remain dormant until 1908, when Stanislaw Zdzitowiecki, the Bishop of Kujawy, reactivated the process. On 27 May 1925 Pope Pius XI proclaimed Bogumilus, as Blessed. Later Pope Paul VI would bestow on Bogumilus the patronage of the Archdiocese of Gniezno.

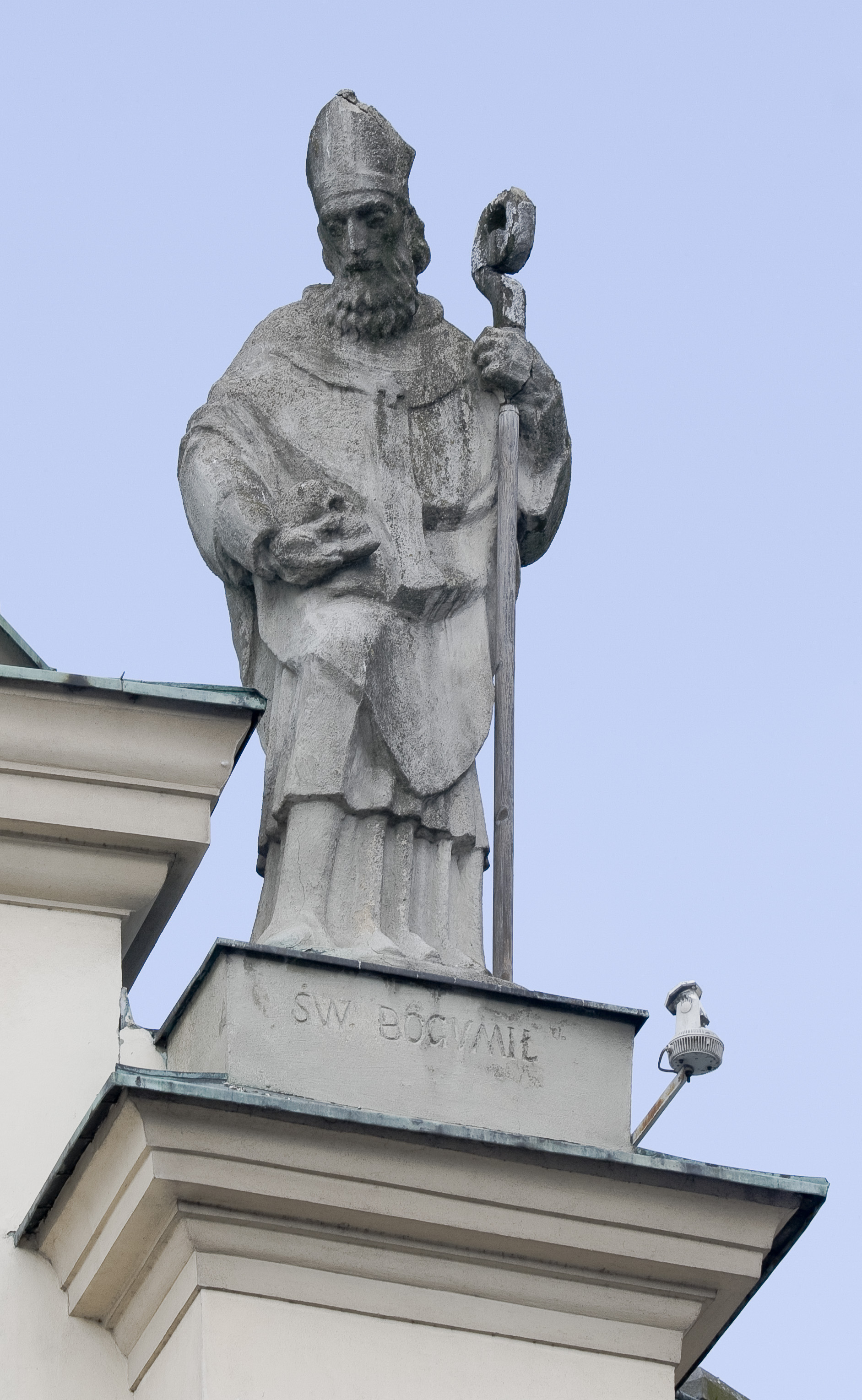
Statue of Bogumilus located on the Gniezno Cathedral.

== Historical confusion ==
Some scholars believe that Bogumilus is the amalgamation of two historical figures by the names of Bogumił and Piotr, one of whom was the archbishop and the other a monk or the bishop of Poznań.

There is no definitive evidence, to support this, however, and most modern historians regard Bogumił Piotr, as one historical person, who is venerated in the Catholic Church.

In support of this view, it is possible that the archbishop had been christened as Piotr and might have taken the name Bogumił as his monastic name. The support for this theory is the fact that this name already had a place of honor in the Camaldolese Order, as the original Bogumilus was a member of the first monastery of the Order outside of Italy. All the members of this 11th-century community were murdered and are considered martyrs within the Order. An account of their deaths was written by their colleague, Saint Bruno of Querfurt, and the memory of these martyred monks would have been still fresh to the Polish Camaldolese monks of his day.

Archbishop Bogumił is mentioned as the probable founder of Gniezno door.

== See also ==
- Dobrowska Foundation
