= Kolnica =

Kolnica may refer to the following places:

- Kolnica, Gmina Brudzew in Greater Poland Voivodeship (west-central Poland)
- Kolnica, Gmina Malanów in Greater Poland Voivodeship (west-central Poland)
- Kolnica, Podlaskie Voivodeship (north-east Poland)
- Kolnica, Opole Voivodeship (south-west Poland)
