= Zbigniew Dolata =

Polish politician (born 1965)

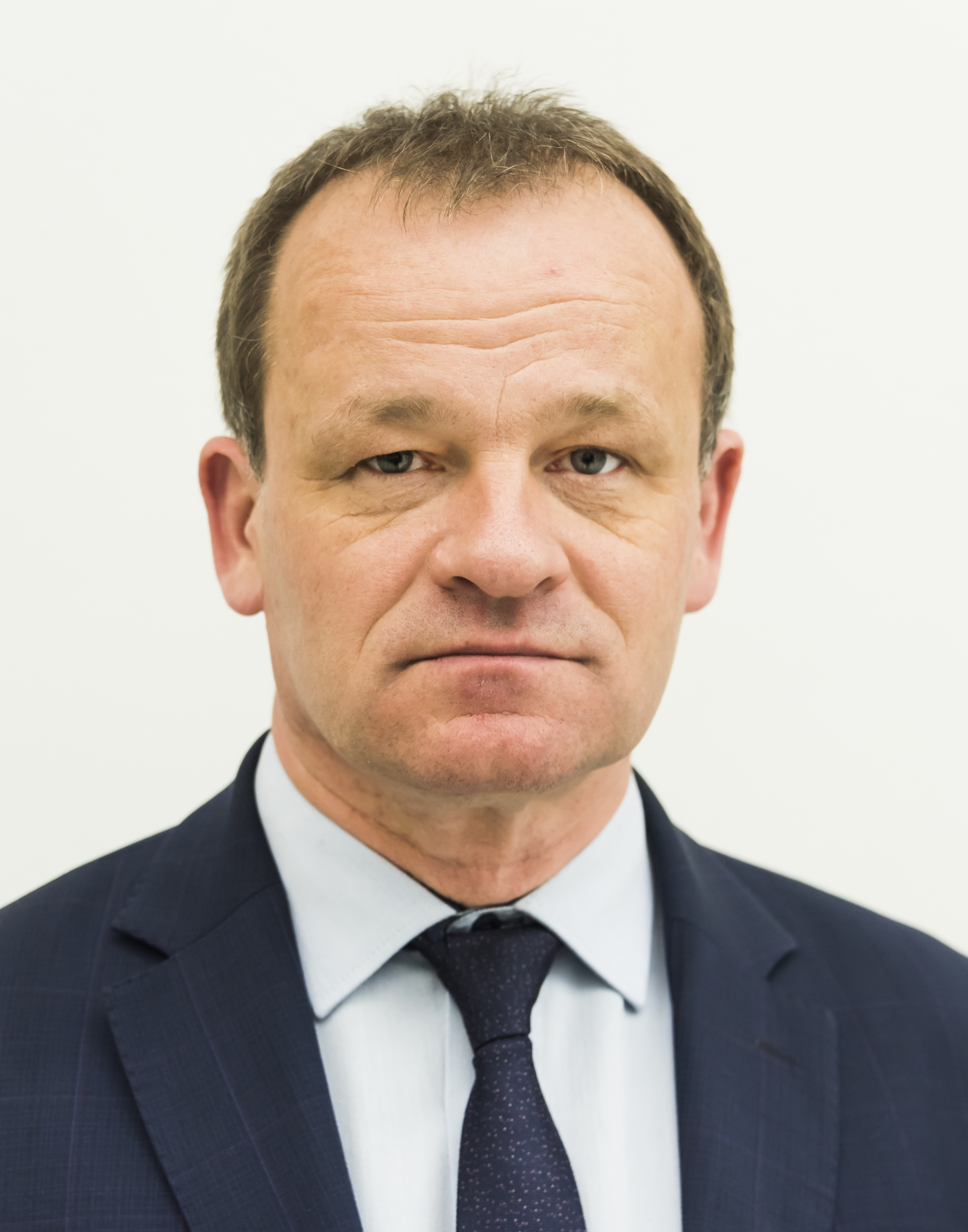

member of Sejm 2005-2007
- In office 25 September 2005 – ?

Personal details
- Born: 1 December 1965 (age 60)
- Party: Law and Justice

Zbigniew Dolata (born 1 December 1965 in Koźmin) is a Polish politician. He was elected to the Sejm on 25 September 2005, getting 9880 votes in 37 Konin district as a candidate from the Law and Justice list.

== See also ==
- Members of Polish Sejm 2005-2007
