= Tarnowa =

Tarnowa may refer to the following places:

- Tarnowa, Gmina Rakoniewice, Grodzisk County in Greater Poland Voivodeship (west-central Poland)
- Tarnowa, Gmina Brudzew, Turek County in Greater Poland Voivodeship (central Poland)
- Tarnowa, Gmina Tuliszków, Turek County in Greater Poland Voivodeship (central Poland)
- Tarnowa, Września County in Greater Poland Voivodeship (west-central Poland)
- Tarnowa, Łódź Voivodeship (central Poland)
