= Dąbrowice Częściowe =

- Village

- Location within Poland
- Coordinates: 52°8′N 18°30′E
- Country: Poland
- Voivodeship: Greater Poland
- County: Koło
- Gmina: Kościelec

Population
  - Total: 240
- Time zone: UTC+1 (CET)
  - Summer (DST): UTC+2 (CEST)
- Vehicle registration: PKL

Dąbrowice Częściowe [dɔmbrɔˈvit͡sɛ t͡ʂɛ̃ɕˈt͡ɕɔvɛ] is a village in the administrative district of Gmina Kościelec, within Koło County, Greater Poland Voivodeship, in central Poland.
