= Olimpia, Greater Poland Voivodeship =

Olimpia
- Village
- Location within Poland
- Coordinates: 52°7′N 18°35′E
- Country: Poland
- Voivodeship: Greater Poland
- County: Turek
- Gmina: Brudzew

Olimpia [ɔˈlimpja] is a village in the administrative district of Gmina Brudzew, within Turek County, Greater Poland Voivodeship, in west-central Poland.
