= Kuźnica Koźmińska =

- Village
- Location within Poland
- Coordinates: 52°4′N 18°41′E
- Country: Poland
- Voivodeship: Greater Poland
- County: Turek
- Gmina: Brudzew

Kuźnica Koźmińska (Polish pronunciation: [kuʑˈɲit͡sa kɔʑˈmij̃ska]) is a village in the administrative district of Gmina Brudzew, within Turek County, Greater Poland Voivodeship, in west-central Poland.
