= Gmina Brudzew =

Gmina Brudzew Brudzew Commune
- Gmina
- Coat of arms

- Coordinates (Brudzew): 52°5′N 18°36′E
- Country: Poland
- Voivodeship: Greater Poland
- County: Turek
- Seat: Brudzew

Area
  - Total: 112.72 km^{2} (43.52 sq mi)

Population (2006)
  - Total: 6,115
  - Density: 54.25/km^{2} (140.5/sq mi)
- Time zone: UTC+1 (CET)
  - Summer (DST): UTC+2 (CEST)
- Vehicle registration: PTU
- Website: http://www.brudzew.pl/

Gmina Brudzew is a rural gmina (administrative district) in Turek County, Greater Poland Voivodeship, in central Poland. Its seat is the village of Brudzew, which lies approximately 11 kilometres (7 mi) north-east of Turek and 121 km (75 mi) east of the regional capital Poznań.

The gmina covers an area of 112.72 square kilometres (43.5 sq mi), and as of 2006 its total population is 6,115.

== Villages ==
Gmina Brudzew contains the villages and settlements of Bierzmo, Bierzmo Duże, Bogdałów, Bogdałów-Kolonia, Bratuszyn, Brudzew, Brudzew Kolonia, Brudzyń, Chrząblice, Cichów, Dąbrowa, Galew, Głowy, Goleszczyzna, Izabelin, Janiszew, Janów, Koble, Kolnica, Koźmin, Kozubów, Krwony, Krwony Kolonia, Kuźnica Janiszewska, Kuźnica Koźmińska, Kwiatków, Marulew, Olimpia, Podłużyce, Sacały, Smolina, Tarnowa and Wincentów.

== Neighbouring gminas ==
Gmina Brudzew is bordered by the gminas of Dąbie, Kościelec, Przykona, Turek, Uniejów and Władysławów.
