= Smolina =

- Village
- Location within Poland
- Coordinates: 52°5′N 18°32′E
- Country: Poland
- Voivodeship: Greater Poland
- County: Turek
- Gmina: Brudzew
- Population: 80

Smolina [smɔˈlina] is a village in the administrative district of Gmina Brudzew, within Turek County, Greater Poland Voivodeship, in west-central Poland.
