= Cichocki =

Wąż coat of arms used by some of Cichocki family

Cichocki (feminine: Cichocka; plural: Cichoccy) is a Polish surname. Some of them use: Lubicz, Nałęcz or Wąż coat of arms. It may refer to:

- Andrzej Cichocki (born 1947), Polish computer scientist, electrical engineer and a professor at Nicolaus Copernicus University
- Angelika Cichocka (born 1988), Polish athlete
- Bartosz Cichocki (born 1976), Polish political scientist, historian, diplomat
- Chris Cichocki (born 1963), American ice hockey player
- Jacek Cichocki (born 1971), Polish politician
- Jan August Cichocki (1750–1795), Polish general
- Kasper Cichocki (1545–1616), Polish ecclesiastic, theologian and polemicist
- Lena Dąbkowska-Cichocka (born 1973), Polish politician
- Leslie Cichocki (born 1988), American Paralympic swimmer
- Marek Cichocki, a Polish philosopher, historian of political thought.
- Mateusz Cichocki (born 1992), Polish footballer

== See also ==
- 18845 Cichocki, minor planet
- Cichowski
