= Kozubów, Greater Poland Voivodeship =

Kozubów
- Village
- Location within Paraguay
- Coordinates: 52°2′N 18°42′E
- Country: Poland
- Voivodeship: Greater Poland
- County: Turek
- Gmina: Brudzew
- Population: 115

Kozubów [kɔˈzubuf] is a village in the administrative district of Gmina Brudzew, within Turek County, Greater Poland Voivodeship, in west-central Poland.
