= Białków Kościelny =

- Village
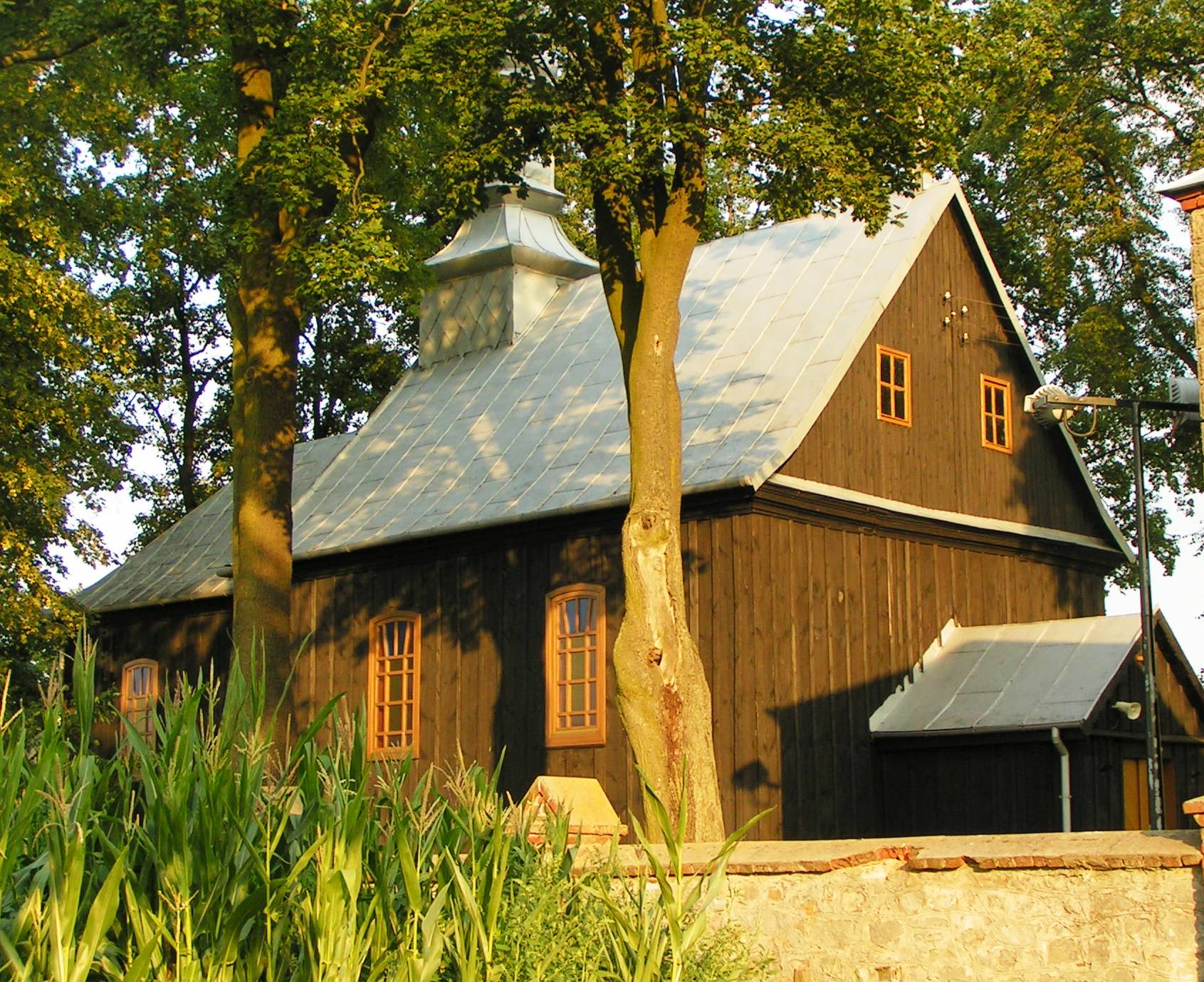
- Saint Stanislaus church in Białków Kościelny

- Location within Poland
- Coordinates: 52°9′48″N 18°34′44″E
- Country: Poland
- Voivodeship: Greater Poland
- County: Koło
- Gmina: Kościelec

Population
  - Total: 200
- Time zone: UTC+1 (CET)
  - Summer (DST): UTC+2 (CEST)
- Vehicle registration: PKL

Białków Kościelny [ˈbjau̯kuf kɔɕˈt͡ɕɛlnɨ] is a village in the administrative district of Gmina Kościelec, within Koło County, Greater Poland Voivodeship, in central Poland.
