= Białków Górny =

- Village
- Location within Poland
- Coordinates: 52°9′31″N 18°33′36″E
- Country: Poland
- Voivodeship: Greater Poland
- County: Koło
- Gmina: Kościelec
- Time zone: UTC+1 (CET)
  - Summer (DST): UTC+2 (CEST)
- Vehicle registration: PKL

Białków Górny [ˈbjau̯kuf ˈɡurnɨ] is a village in the administrative district of Gmina Kościelec, within Koło County, Greater Poland Voivodeship, in central Poland.
