= Sulejów Abbey =

Abbey in Sulejów, Poland

- Opactwo Cystersów w Sulejowie
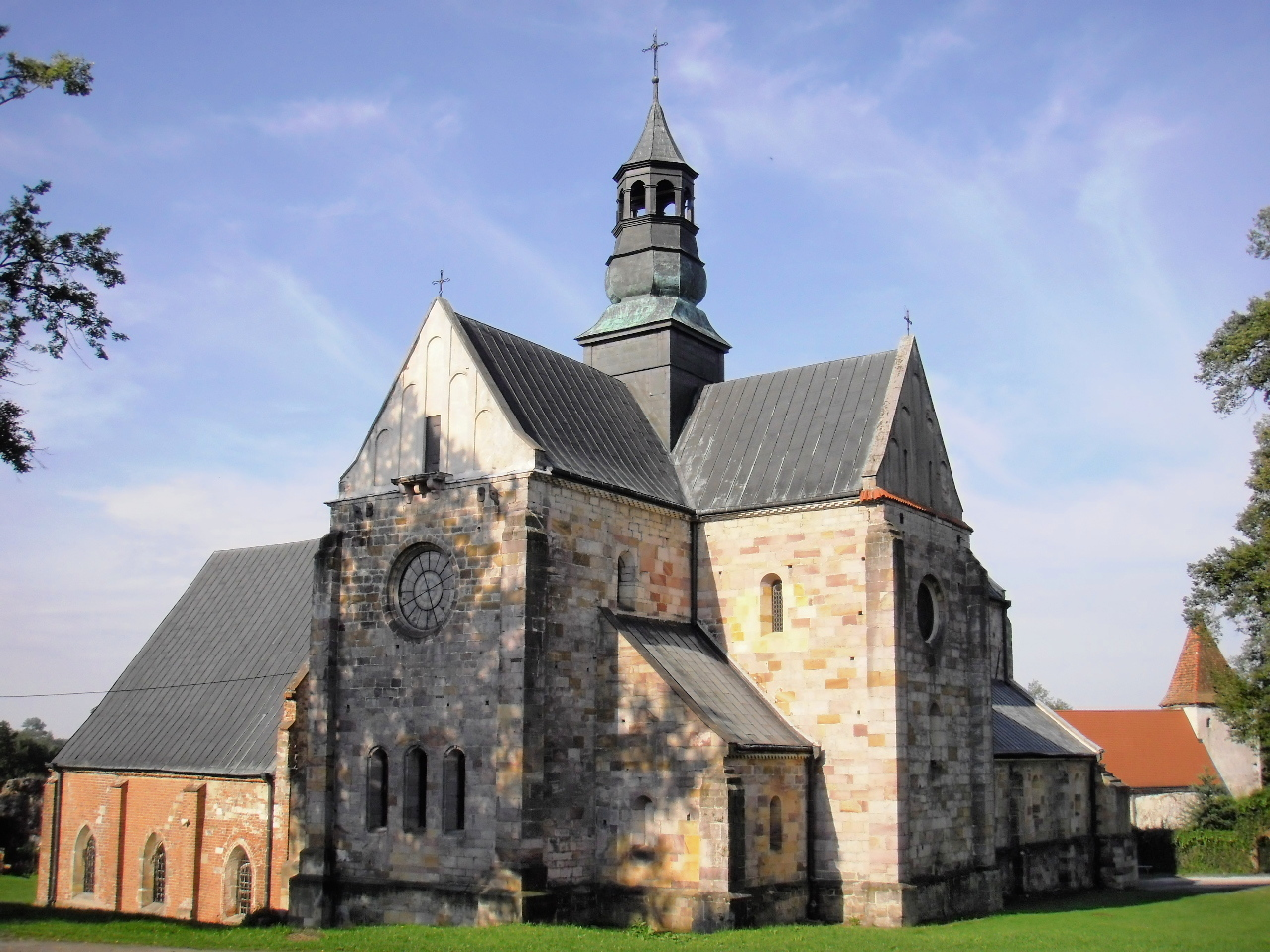
- Saint Thomas of Canterbury church

- Location within Poland

Monastery information
- Order: Cistercians
- Established: 1176

People
- Founder: Casimir II the Just

Architecture
- Style: Romanesque, Gothic

Site
- Location: Sulejów
- Country: Poland
- Coordinates: 51°21′N 19°52′E

Historic Monument of Poland
- Designated: 2012-10-22
- Reference no.: Dz. U. z 2012 r. poz. 1242

Sulejów Abbey (Polish: Opactwo Cystersów w Sulejowie) is a historic Cistercian monastery complex in the Podklasztorze district of Sulejów, Poland. Founded around 1176 by Duke Casimir II the Just, it was established by monks from Morimond Abbey in France. Its church, dedicated to the Virgin Mary and Saint Thomas Becket, was consecrated in 1232 and is an important surviving example of the transition from Romanesque to Gothic architecture in Poland.The complex is particularly notable for its extensive medieval fortifications, constructed and enlarged between the 14th and 16th centuries.

The abbey also hosted an assembly in 1318 that petitioned Pope John XXII for permission to crown Władysław I Łokietek King of Poland. Dissolved in 1819, the monastery was reoccupied by Cistercian monks in 1986. The complex was designated a Historic Monument of Poland in 2012.

== History ==
The abbey was founded in 1176–1177 by Casimir II the Just, Duke of Sandomierz, who brought monks from Morimond in Burgundy for this purpose. In 1173, Casimir had assumed control over the entire Duchy of Sandomierz, previously ruled by his brother Henry of Sandomierz. Bringing in the monks was intended to strengthen his authority. He settled them on the edge of his domain, near a growing market settlement Sulejów and a crossing over the Pilica River, where he maintained a customs post.

The foundation of the abbey was overseen by Janik, Archbishop of Gniezno, and the Jędrzejów Abbey. As part of its endowment, the duke granted the new community seven villages (Sulejów, Strzelce, Dąbrowa, Góra, Byczyna, Tądów and Cienia), along with several landholdings, probably including their inhabitants. Count Radosław, a close associate of the duke, added five more villages (Kępa, Mianów, Puczniew, Stefanów and Piotrów), located on the Ner River. An otherwise unknown knight named Bałdrzych donated the village of Bałdrzychów, together with its church, to the Cistercians. The village was also situated on the Ner River.

In 1191, the abbey church was consecrated and dedicated to St Thomas of Canterbury, replacing what was probably an earlier dedication to St Blaise.

== Description ==
The most notable parts of the abbey are:

- the Romanesque church of Saint Thomas Becket of Canterbury
- the Romanesque fortifications

The monastery was dissolved in 1819. After many years of industrial and business use the surviving buildings are now used by the present parish.

The abbey is one of Poland's official national Historic Monuments (Pomnik historii), as designated October 22, 2012. Its listing is maintained by the National Heritage Board of Poland.

== Gallery ==
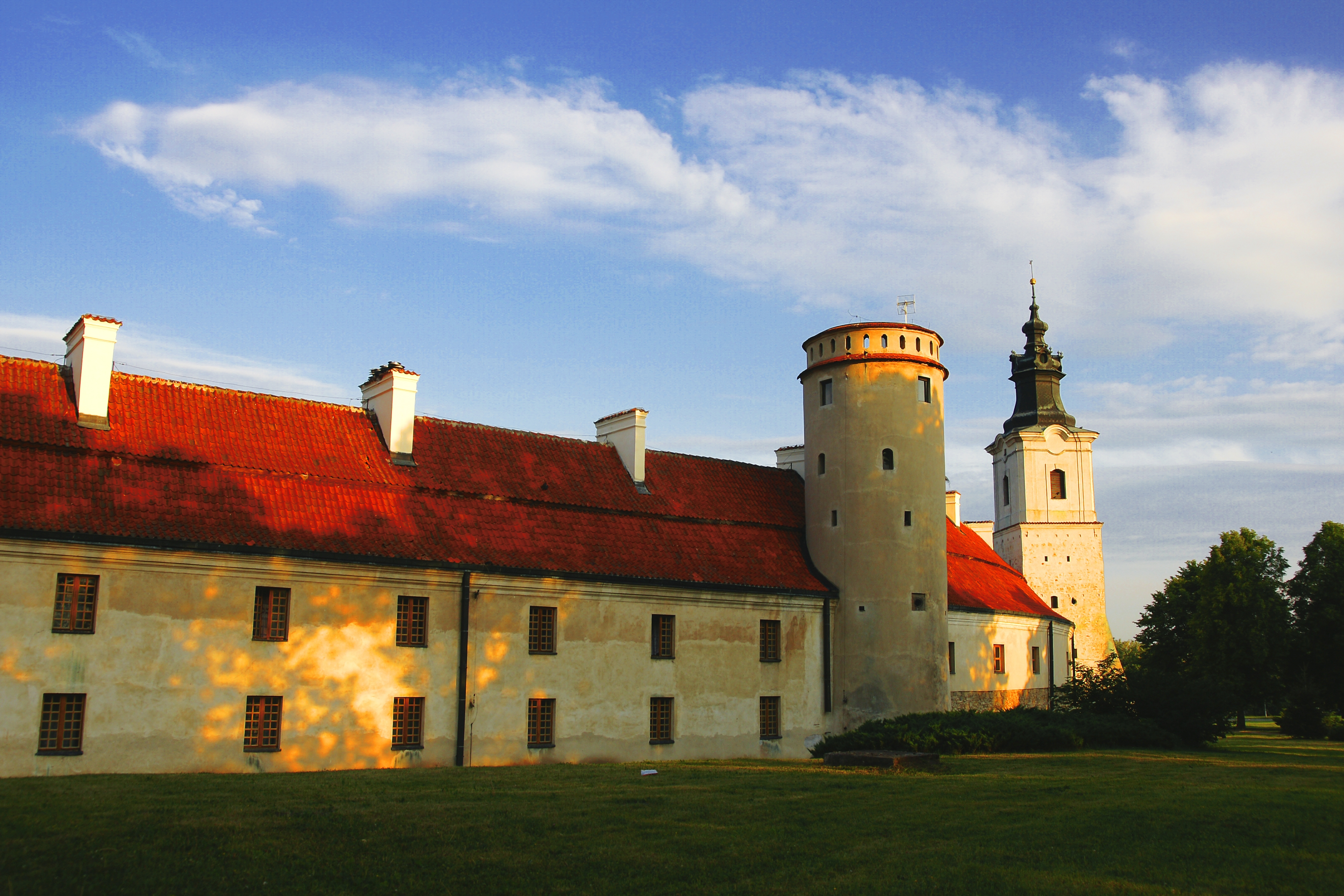
Abbey

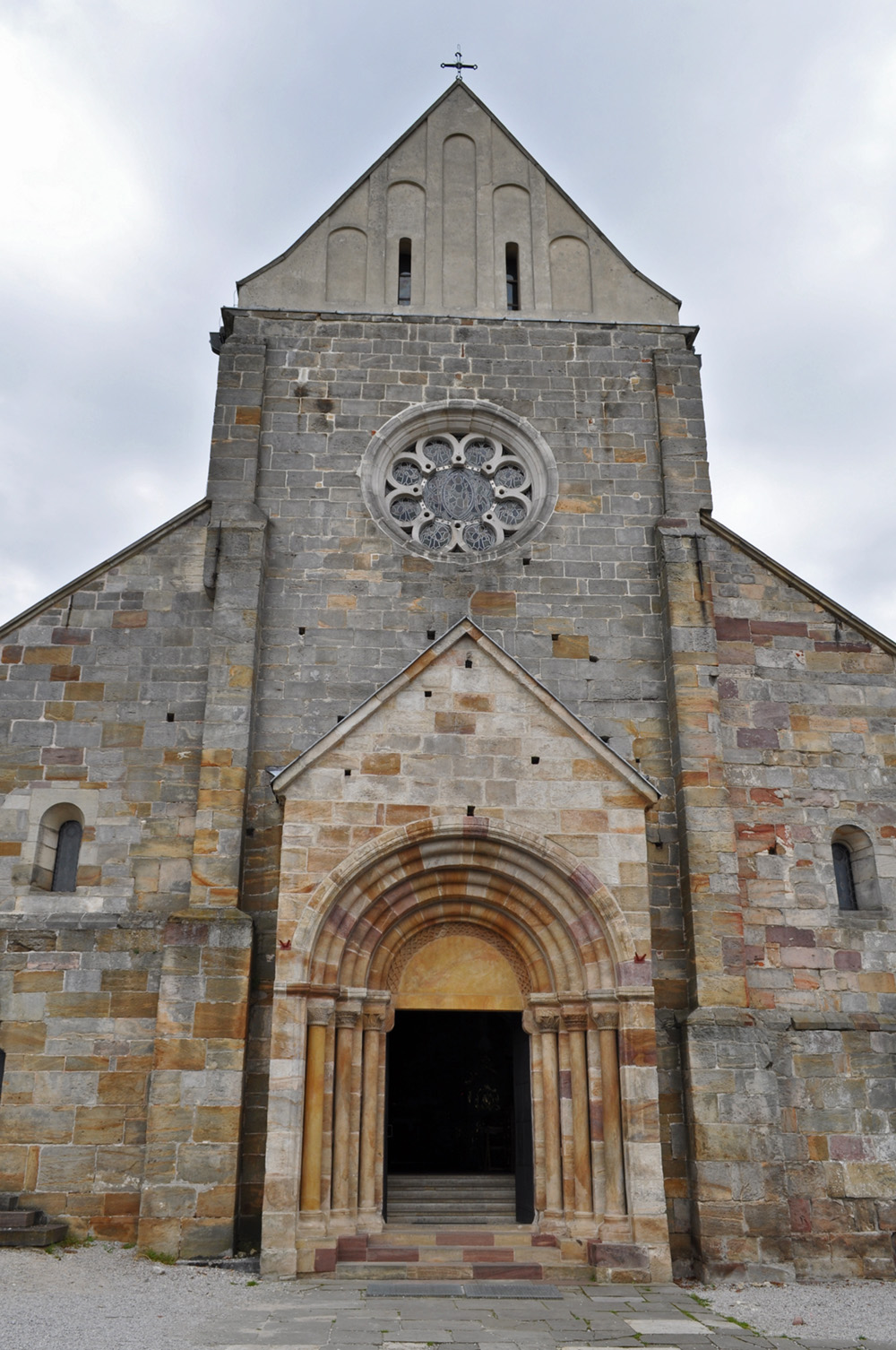
Abbey church façade

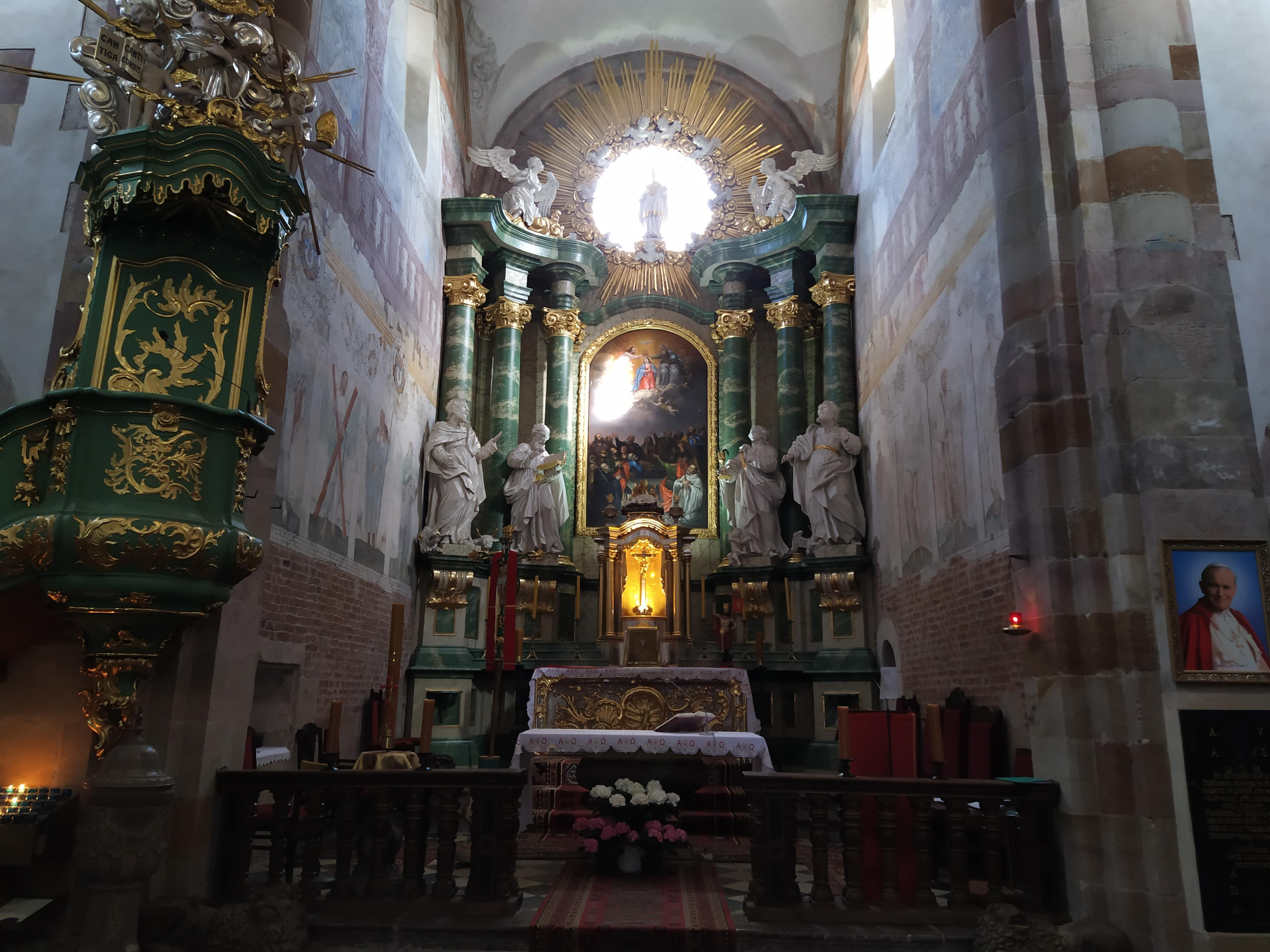
Abbey church interior

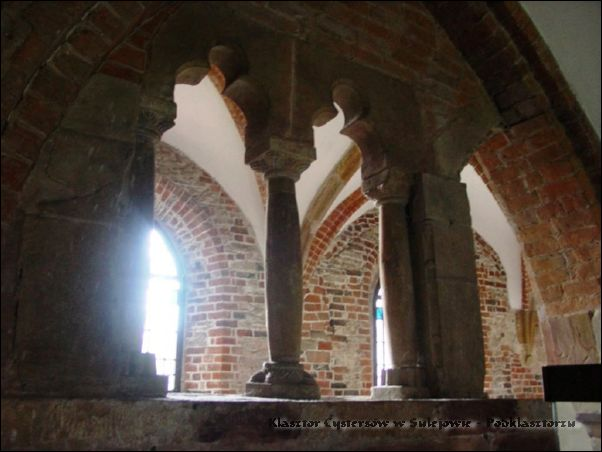
Chapter house gallery

== See also ==
- Tyniec Abbey
- Dobrowska Foundation

== Bibliography ==
- Dobosz, Józef (1995). "Okoliczności i motywy fundacji klasztoru cystersów w Sulejowie". Nasza Przeszłość (in Polish). 83: 177–187. doi:10.52204/np.1995.83.177-187.
