= Galew, Turek County =

Galew
- Village
- Location within Poland
- Coordinates: 52°4′7″N 18°32′55″E
- Country: Poland
- Voivodeship: Greater Poland
- County: Turek
- Gmina: Brudzew
- Population: 320

Galew [ˈɡalɛf] is a village in the administrative district of Gmina Brudzew, within Turek County, Greater Poland Voivodeship, in west-central Poland.
