= Mariampol, Greater Poland Voivodeship =

Mariampol
- Village
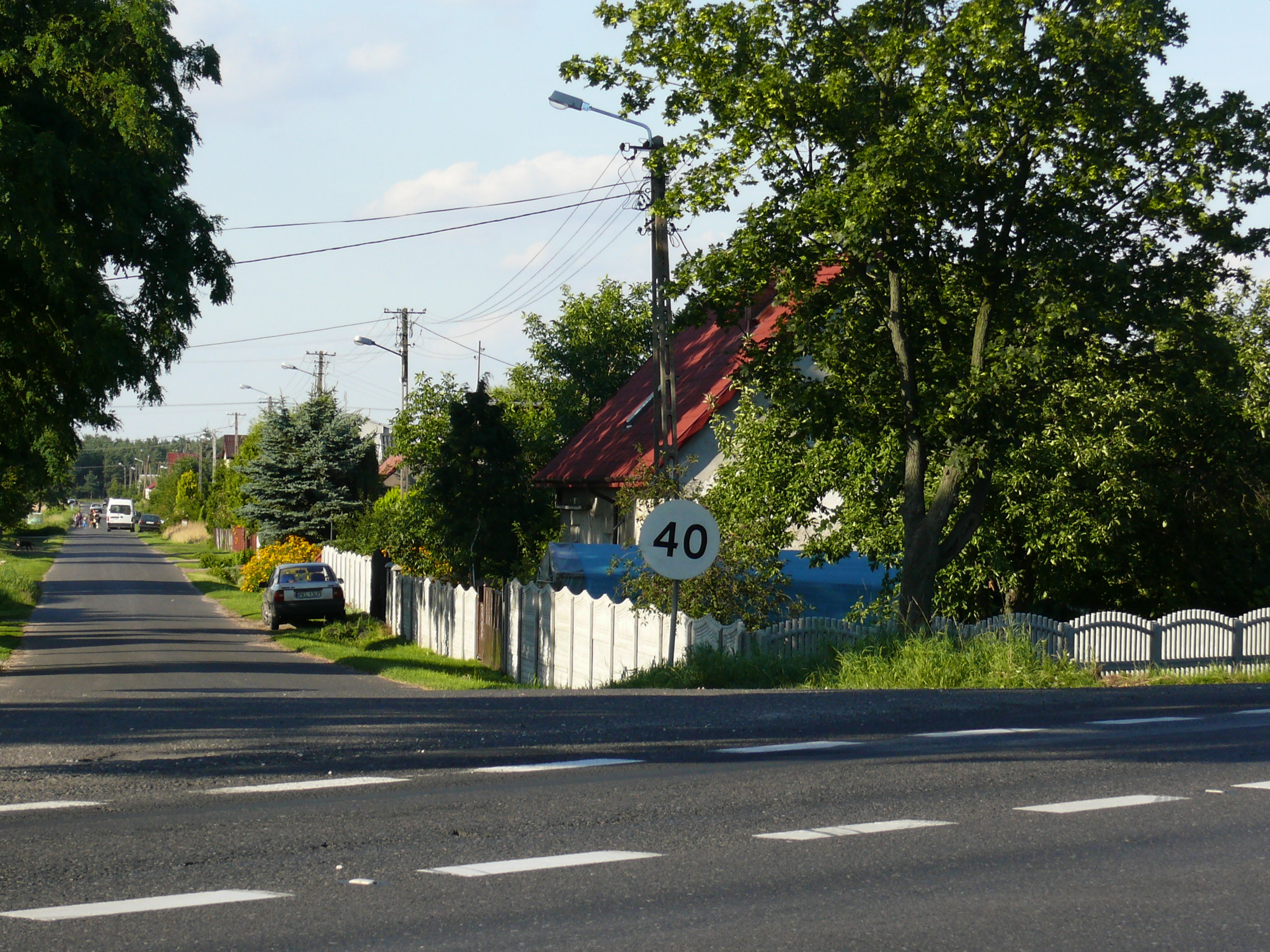
- Street of Mariampol

- Location within Poland
- Coordinates: 52°10′45″N 18°35′02″E
- Country: Poland
- Voivodeship: Greater Poland
- County: Koło
- Gmina: Kościelec
- Time zone: UTC+1 (CET)
  - Summer (DST): UTC+2 (CEST)
- Vehicle registration: PKL

Mariampol [maˈrjampɔl] is a village in the administrative district of Gmina Kościelec, within Koło County, Greater Poland Voivodeship, in central Poland.
