= Leszcze, Gmina Kościelec =

Leszcze
- Village
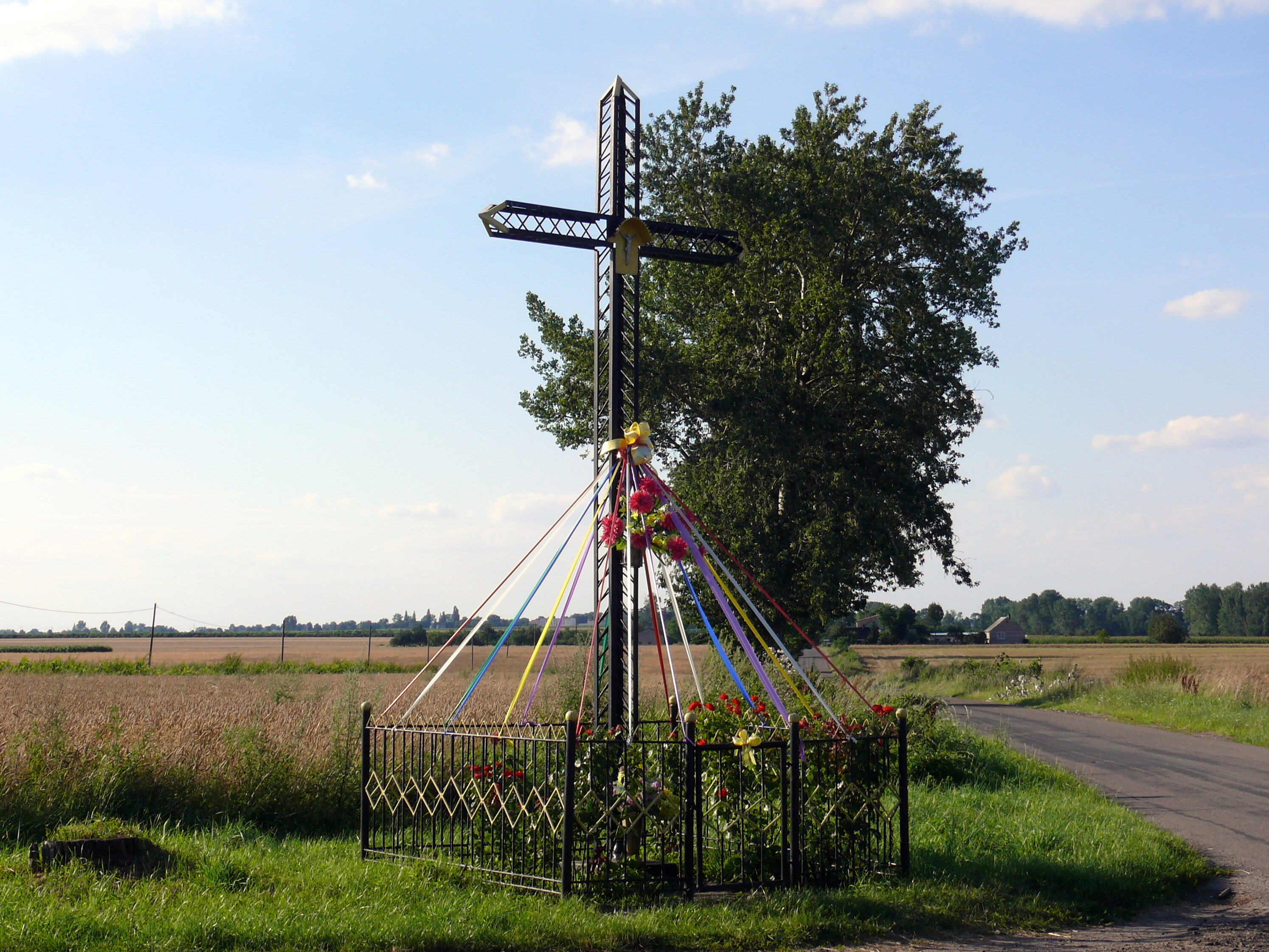
- Wayside cross in Leszcze

- Location within Poland
- Coordinates: 52°09′28″N 18°34′58″E
- Country: Poland
- Voivodeship: Greater Poland
- County: Koło
- Gmina: Kościelec
- Time zone: UTC+1 (CET)
  - Summer (DST): UTC+2 (CEST)
- Vehicle registration: PKL

Leszcze [ˈlɛʂt͡ʂɛ] is a village in the administrative district of Gmina Kościelec, within Koło County, Greater Poland Voivodeship, in central Poland.
