= Brudzew Kolonia =

- Village
- Location within Poland
- Coordinates: 52°5′N 18°36′E
- Country: Poland
- Voivodeship: Greater Poland
- County: Turek
- Gmina: Brudzew

Brudzew Kolonia [ˈbrud͡zɛf kɔˈlɔɲa] is a village in the administrative district of Gmina Brudzew, within Turek County, Greater Poland Voivodeship, in west-central Poland.
