= Wąż coat of arms =

Polish coat of arms

Wąż
- Battle cry: Wężyk, Zachorz
- Earliest mention: 1389
- Towns: none
- Families: 142 names altogether: Ambroszkiewicz, Ambroziewicz, Ambrożewicz, Ambrożkiewicz, Babaszowski, Benkuński, Bielecki, Bieńkuński, Bogwiecki, Bogwiedzki, Bomblewicz, Borch, Borejsza, Borek, Bork, Brzostowicz, Bugwidzki, Bykowski, Cichocki, Cichoński, Ciechomski, Ciechowski, Ciekowski, Cimochowski, Czechowicki, Damięcki, Demontowicz, Deszniański, Deszyn, Deszyński, Dłotowski, Dłótowski, Dłutowski, Dobrzankowski, Fiersowicz, Funger, Furs, Fursewicz, Gardziński, German, Górski, Groszkowski, Groszowski, Groza, Grozowski, Grudź, Gruzdź, Gruźdź, Grzmucki, Herman, Januszkiewicz, Jasieniecki, Jasieński, Jasiński, Koczalski, Koczelski, Koczulski, Konczan, Koracz, Koran, Kostrowicki, Kostrowiecki, Kostrowski, Kotuszowski, Kotwacz, Kowacz, Koyczan, Kozaczyński, Kozanecki, Kożarski, Krzykowski, Kuczkowski, Kuzarski, Lubochowski, Łojwa, Łojwo, Łoywo, Magiera, Malik, Małdrzycki, Małdrzyk, Mikołajewski, Niadych, Niedych, Obrzyziewicz, Odolski, Ożegowski, Piasecki, Pisecki, Podoliński, Pojałowski, Polanowski, Połajowski, Rabaszowski, Raciborowski, Rajski, Raszewski, Rayski, Rubaszowski, Rucki, Rudzki, Rutski, Rzeszowski, Sakowicz, Samorzewski, Sarcewicz, Siemla, Skałowski, Skoltecki, Skrzyński, Skultecki, Sławicki, Sukowicz, Sułkowicz, Sułkowski, Surkowski, Syktowski, Sytkowski, Szamoszewski, Szczubioł, Szemesz, Szemiosz, Szemosz, Szkublecki, Szkutecki, Szurkowski, Trzeciak, Turowicz, Wązik, Wąż, Wążkowski, Wążodaw, Wężyk, Wialbut, Widucki, Widycki, Wielawski, Wilczkowski, Zyrkiewicz, Żmigrocki, Żmigrodzki, Żmijewski, Żmijowski

Wąż (Polish for "Snake") is a Polish coat of arms. It was used by several szlachta (noble) families under the Polish–Lithuanian Commonwealth.

== Blazon ==
Gules, a snake vert, crowned or, holding an apple of the same, with two leaves vert.

== Notable bearers ==
Notable bearers of this coat of arms have included:

- Guillaume Apollinaire (Wilhelm Albert Włodzimierz Apolinary Kostrowicki)

== See also ==
- Polish heraldry
- Heraldry
- Coat of arms
