= Dąbrowa, Gmina Brudzew =

Dąbrowa
- Village
- Location within Poland
- Coordinates: 52°4′N 18°40′E
- Country: Poland
- Voivodeship: Greater Poland
- County: Turek
- Gmina: Brudzew
- Elevation: 55 m (180 ft)

Population
  - Total: 170

Dąbrowa [dɔmˈbrɔva] is a village in the administrative district of Gmina Brudzew, within Turek County, Greater Poland Voivodeship, in central Poland.

Two Polish citizens were murdered by Nazi Germany in the village during World War II.
