= Gmina Kościelec =

Gmina Kościelec Kościelec Commune
- Gmina
- Flag Coat of arms

- Coordinates (Kościelec): 52°10′28″N 18°34′12″E
- Country: Poland
- Voivodeship: Greater Poland
- County: Koło
- Seat: Kościelec

Area
  - Total: 105.9 km^{2} (40.9 sq mi)

Population (2010)
  - Total: 6,654
  - Density: 62.83/km^{2} (162.7/sq mi)
- Time zone: UTC+1 (CET)
  - Summer (DST): UTC+2 (CEST)
- Vehicle registration: PKL

Gmina Kościelec is a rural gmina (administrative district) in Koło County, Greater Poland Voivodeship, in central Poland. Its seat is the village of Kościelec, which lies approximately 6 kilometres (4 mi) south-west of Koło and 116 km (72 mi) east of the regional capital Poznań.

The gmina covers an area of 105.9 square kilometres (40.9 sq mi), and as of 2006 its total population is 6,667.

== Villages ==
Gmina Kościelec contains the villages and settlements of Białków Górny, Białków Kościelny, Dąbrowice, Dąbrowice Częściowe, Daniszew, Dobrów, Gąsiorów, Gozdów, Kościelec, Łęka, Leszcze, Mariampol, Police Mostowe, Police Średnie, Ruszków Drugi, Ruszków Pierwszy, Straszków, Trzęśniew, Trzęśniew Mały, Tury and Waki.

== Neighbouring gminas ==
Gmina Kościelec is bordered by the town of Koło and by the gminas of Brudzew, Dąbie, Koło, Kramsk, Krzymów and Władysławów.

== See also ==
- Dobrowska Foundation
