= Piotr Łabędź =

His Eminence Piotr Labedz
- Archbishop of Gniezno
- Church: Roman Catholic
- Archdiocese: Gniezno
- Installed: before 1191
- Term ended: 1198/9
- Predecessor: Bogumilus
- Successor: Henryk Kietlicz

Personal details
- Born: unknown
- Died: 20 August 1198

Piotr Łabędzi (died 19, 20 or 21 August 1198) was a Catholic Bishop of Poznań and Archbishop of Gniezno. He was commonly mistaken for his predecessor, the Blessed Bogumił (as Bogumił-Piotr), but recent studies classify them as two different people. Łabędzi most likely came from the powerful Łabędzi family. Nothing is known about his life before consecration. A few years after becoming bishop, he was promoted to Archbishop of Gniezno.
