= Dobrów, Greater Poland Voivodeship =

Dobrów
- Village
- Holy Trinity church in Dobrów

- Location within Poland
- Coordinates: 52°9′N 18°38′E
- Country: Poland
- Voivodeship: Greater Poland
- County: Koło
- Gmina: Kościelec

Population (approx.)
  - Total: 1,000
- Time zone: UTC+1 (CET)
  - Summer (DST): UTC+2 (CEST)
- Vehicle registration: PKL

Dobrów [ˈdɔbruf] is a village in the administrative district of Gmina Kościelec, within Koło County, Greater Poland Voivodeship, in central Poland.

The village has an approximate population of 1,000.

== History ==
Three Polish citizens were murdered by Nazi Germany in the village during World War II.

== See also ==
- Dobrowska Foundation
