= Brudzew, Turek County =

Brudzew
- Village
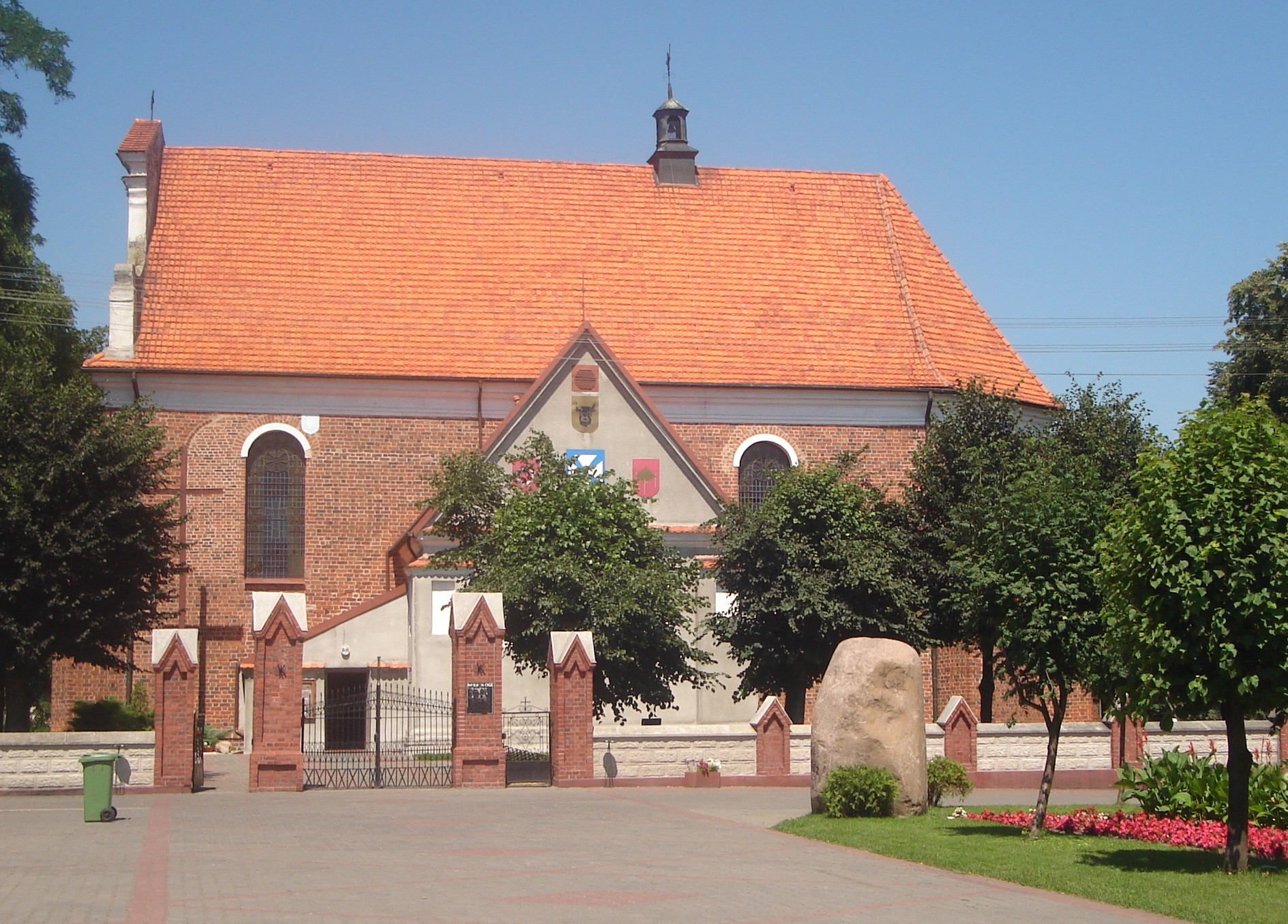
- Church of Saint Nicholas

- Location within Poland
- Coordinates: 52°5′58″N 18°36′15″E
- Country: Poland
- Voivodeship: Greater Poland
- County: Turek
- Gmina: Brudzew

Population
  - Total: 1,620
- Time zone: UTC+1 (CET)
  - Summer (DST): UTC+2 (CEST)
- Website: http://brudzew.pl/

Brudzew [ˈbrud͡zɛf] is a village in Turek County, Greater Poland Voivodeship, in central Poland. It is the seat of the gmina (administrative district) called Gmina Brudzew. It is notable for being the home town of astronomer, philosopher and diplomat Albert Brudzewski born 1455.

Town rights were granted before 1458 and revoked in 1870.
