= Mikołaj Cichowski =

Polish Jesuit, polemicist and theologian (1598–1669)

Mikołaj Cichowski (also known as Nicolaus Cichovius; 1545 – 27 March 1669) was a Polish Jesuit priest, writer, theologian, religious polemicist and an opponent of the Polish Brethren.

== Life ==
He was born in 1598 in Greater Poland, into a plebeian family. In 1615, he joined the Jesuits and for 3 years he taught Philosophy, for 5 years theology, and for the next 3 years he lectured on the sacred scriptures. As a staunch defender of the Catholic faith he wrote 14 works against the Arians and 2 against the Eastern Orthodox. At his insistence the Arian Polish Brethren were expelled from the country and after it, he called for the consistent enforcement of the act. He died on 27 March 1669 in Kraków.

== Works ==
- Centuria argumentorum pro summa et naturali Christi Domini diuinitate, eiusdemque diuinis perfectionibus
- Colloquium Kioviense de processione Spiritus Sancti a Patre et Filio
- Credo arrianorvm sev confessionis socinistarum vel samosathenistarum vulgo arrianorum [...] imposturae detectae
- Responsvm theologicvm ad triplex scriptum ard Ioannis Markievicz canonici Posnaniensis praepositi Casimirien. etc. contra exemptionem patrum Societatis Iesu a soluendis decimis
- Wizerunek nieprawdy ariańskiej
- Angelici doctoris S. Thomae Aquinatis de Beatissima Virginis Deiparae immaculata conceptione sententia. E multis eius operibus studiose collecta et edita
- Trzydziesci przyczyn, dla ktorych każdy zbawienia dusznego y poczciwości swoiey szanuiący ma się odrażać od zboru tego, ktory arriańskim zowią, z krotką refutacyą katechizmu rakowskiego
- Nowe zawstydzenie socinistów
- Wyklęcie ministrów ariańskich, którzy chcąc się wykręcić z tego, co im zadano w Nowym zawstydzeniu, że diabła za Boga prawdziwego mają... zaklęli diabła, którego... Bogiem prawdziwym zowią
- Epistola paraenetica ad... Jonam Schlichtyng de Bukowiec: V. C. eius epistolae apologeticae reddita. Cui addita est Harmonia fidei catholicae
- Tribunal SS. Patrum orientalium et occidentalium ab Orientibus summe laudatorum, ad quod... controversias expendandas, graeci schismatis propugnatoribus proponit
- Manes Schlichtingiani seu Trutina vindiciarum manium
- Pogrom diabła ariańskiego abo Odpis na dwie książki, które arianie o diable napisali
- Desperata causa Arianorum seu Prodromus
- Obrona zacnych i pobożnych ludzi... przeciwko paskwilowi od jakiegoś ministra ariańskiego przeciw nim napisanemu; z namową do Stanów Koronnych wniesioną, aby przy konstytucjach przeciw arianom... stali
- Namowa do ich mościów koronnych, aby przy konstytucji przeciw arianom statecznie stali i do exekucji przystępowali
- Speculum samosathenistarum vel socianistarum
- Triumphus Sanctissimae et aeternum adorandae Trinitatis
