= Kościelec, Koło County =

Kościelec
- Village
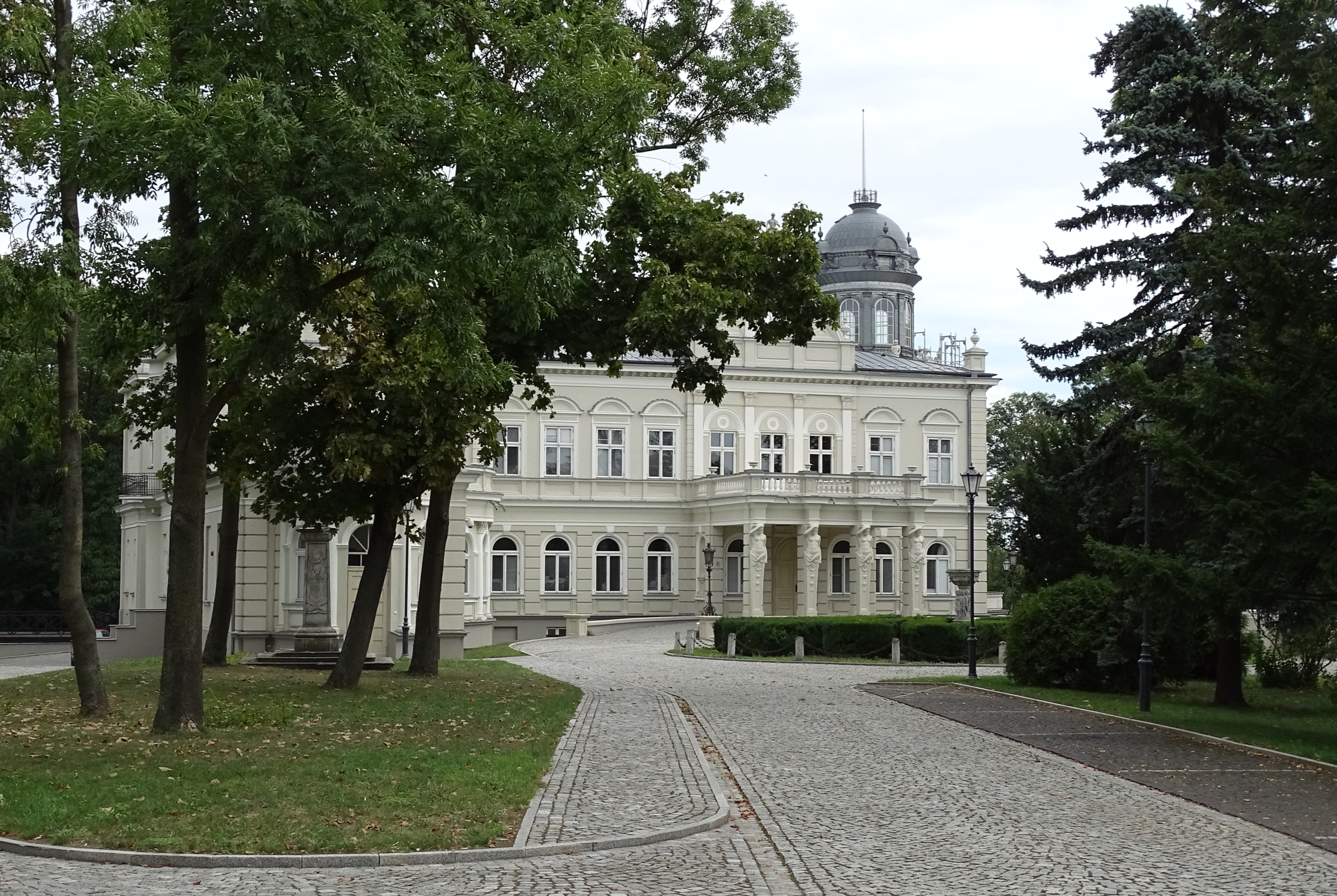
- Kościelec Palace

- Location within Poland
- Coordinates: 52°10′28″N 18°34′12″E
- Country: Poland
- Voivodeship: Greater Poland
- County: Koło
- Gmina: Kościelec

Population
  - Total: 1,300
- Time zone: UTC+1 (CET)
  - Summer (DST): UTC+2 (CEST)
- Vehicle registration: PKL

Kościelec [kɔɕˈt͡ɕɛlɛt͡s] is a village in Koło County, Greater Poland Voivodeship, in central Poland. It is the seat of the gmina (administrative district) called Gmina Kościelec.

== History ==
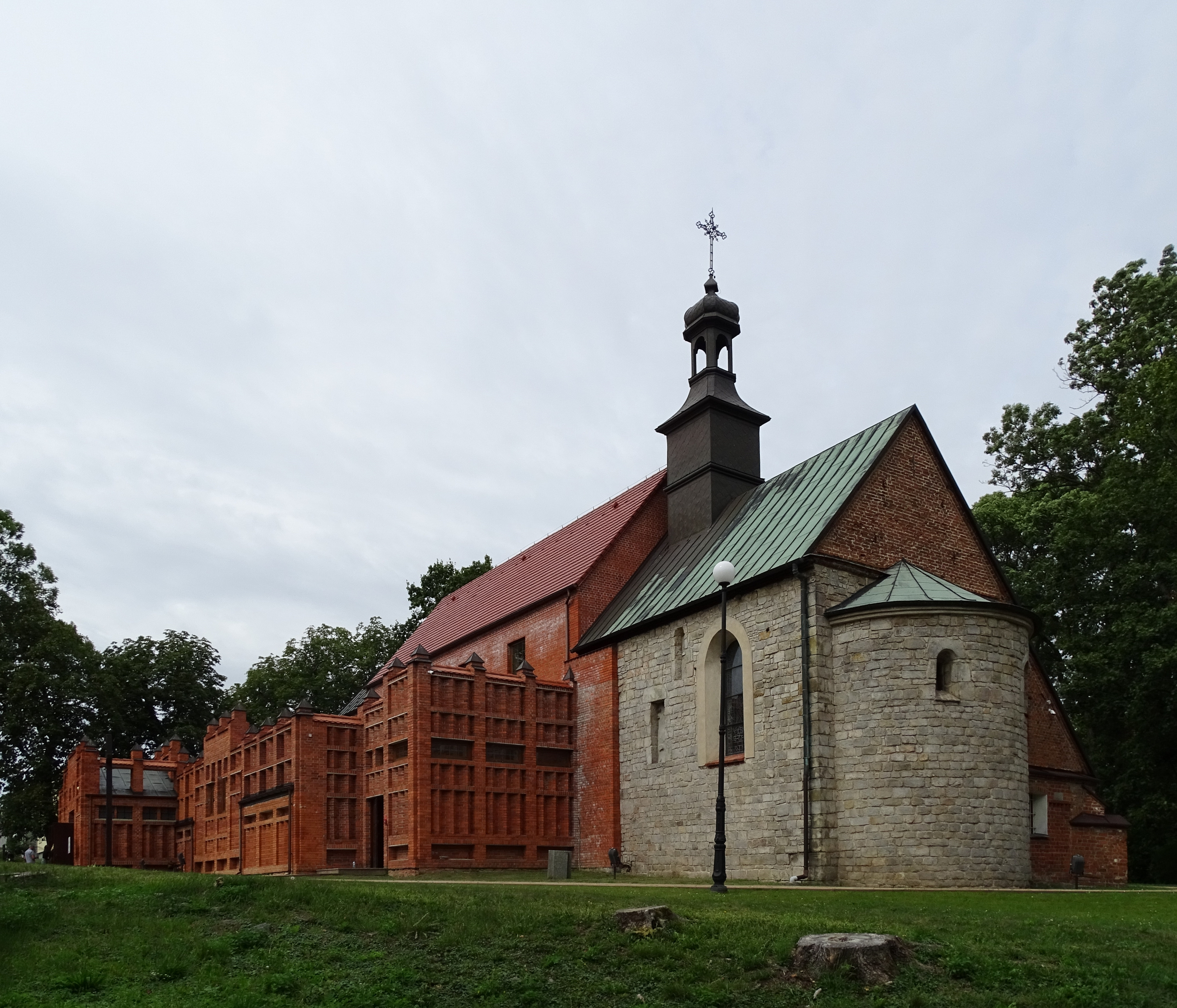
Church of Saint Andrew

As part of the region of Greater Poland, i.e. the cradle of the Polish state, the area formed part of Poland since its establishment in the 10th century. Kościelec was a royal village of the Kingdom of Poland, administratively located in the Konin County in the Kalisz Voivodeship in the Greater Poland Province.

In 1827, it had a population of 285.

During the German invasion of Poland which started World War II, on September 14, 1939, German troops carried out a massacre of a group of hiding Poles (see Nazi crimes against the Polish nation).
