= Cichowo =

Cichowo may refer to the following places in Poland:

- Cichowo, Greater Poland Voivodeship, village in the administrative district of Gmina Krzywiń, within Kościan County, Greater Poland Voivodeship
- Cichowo, Masovian Voivodeship, village in the administrative district of Gmina Krzynowłoga Mała, within Przasnysz County, Masovian Voivodeship
