= Kwiatków, Turek County =

Kwiatków
- Village
- Location within Poland
- Coordinates: 52°5′N 18°40′E
- Country: Poland
- Voivodeship: Greater Poland
- County: Turek
- Gmina: Brudzew
- Population: 190

Kwiatków [ˈkfjatkuf] is a village in the administrative district of Gmina Brudzew, within Turek County, Greater Poland Voivodeship, in west-central Poland.
