= Tarnowa, Gmina Brudzew =

Tarnowa
- Village
- Location within Poland
- Coordinates: 52°6′N 18°33′E
- Country: Poland
- Voivodeship: Greater Poland
- County: Turek
- Gmina: Brudzew

Population
  - Total: 200
- Website: http://www.tarnowa.vgh.pl

Tarnowa [tarˈnɔva] is a village in the administrative district of Gmina Brudzew, within Turek County, Greater Poland Voivodeship, in central Poland.

Two Polish citizens were murdered by Nazi Germany in the village during World War II.
