= Polichno (disambiguation) =

Polichno is a village and municipality in Slovakia.

Polichno may also refer to:

- Polichno, Kuyavian-Pomeranian Voivodeship (north-central Poland)
- Polichno, Piotrków County in Łódź Voivodeship (central Poland)
- Polichno, Radomsko County in Łódź Voivodeship (central Poland)
- Polichno, Kielce County in Świętokrzyskie Voivodeship (south-central Poland)
- Polichno, Pińczów County in Świętokrzyskie Voivodeship (south-central Poland)
- Polichno, Greater Poland Voivodeship (west-central Poland)
- Polichno, Pomeranian Voivodeship (north Poland)
