= Podzamcze Chęcińskie =

- Village
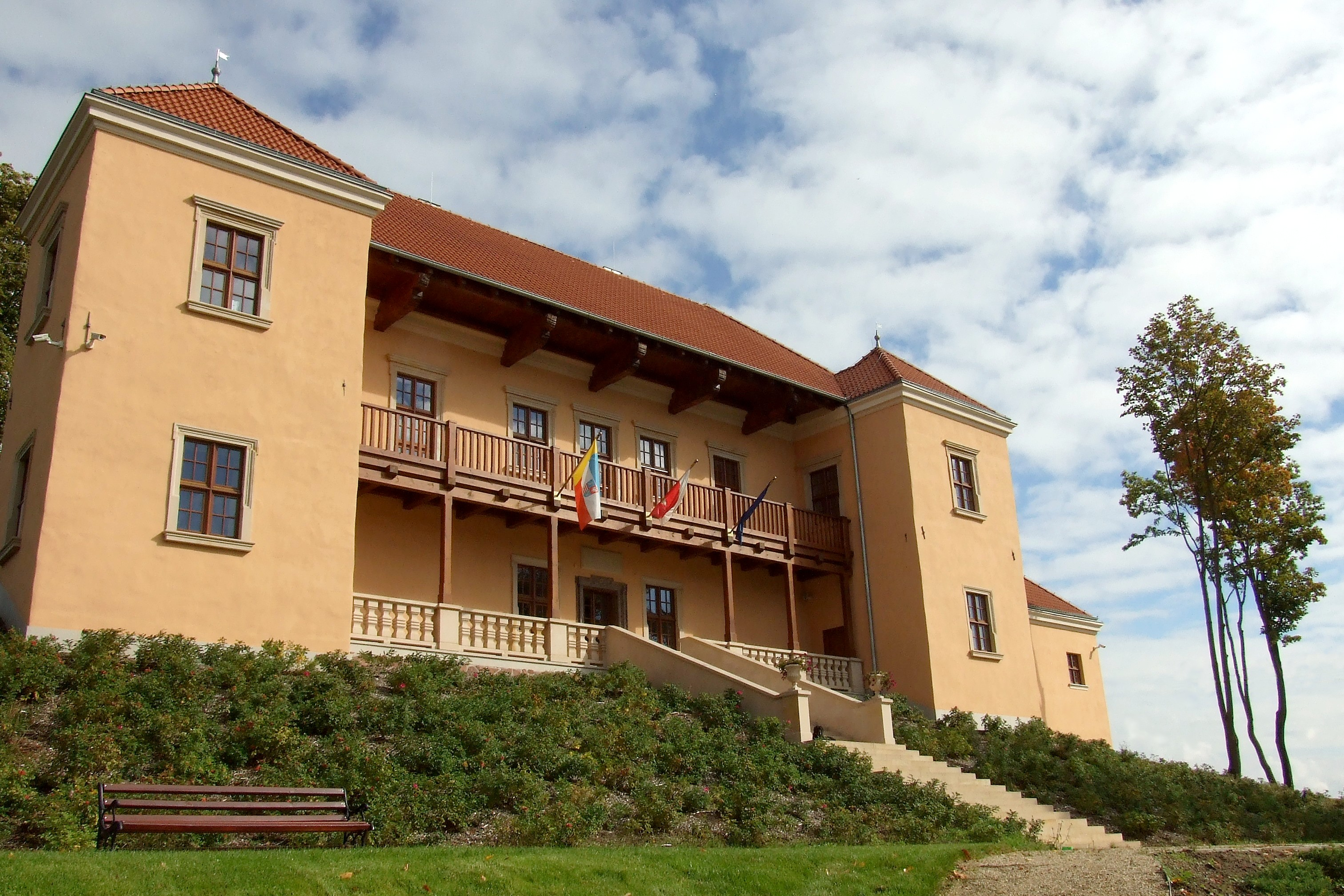
- Castle in Podzamcze Chęcińskie

- Location within Poland
- Coordinates: 50°46′N 20°28′E
- Country: Poland
- Voivodeship: Świętokrzyskie
- County: Kielce
- Gmina: Chęciny

Podzamcze Chęcińskie [pɔˈd͡zamt͡ʂɛ xɛnˈt͡ɕiɲskʲɛ] is a village in the administrative district of Gmina Chęciny, within Kielce County, Świętokrzyskie Voivodeship, in south-central Poland. It lies approximately 5 km (3 mi) south of Chęciny and 17 km (11 mi) south-west of the regional capital Kielce.
