= Wolica, Kielce County =

Wolica
- Village
- Location within Poland
- Coordinates: 50°45′8″N 20°28′46″E
- Country: Poland
- Voivodeship: Świętokrzyskie
- County: Kielce
- Gmina: Chęciny
- Elevation: 238 m (781 ft)
- Population: 1,200

Wolica [vɔˈlit͡sa] is a village in the administrative district of Gmina Chęciny, within Kielce County, Świętokrzyskie Voivodeship, in south-central Poland. It lies approximately 6 km (4 mi) south of Chęciny and 18 km (11 mi) south-west of the regional capital Kielce.
