= Jedlnica =

- Village
- Location within Poland
- Coordinates: 50°48′N 20°22′E
- Country: Poland
- Voivodeship: Świętokrzyskie
- County: Kielce
- Gmina: Chęciny

Jedlnica [jɛdlˈnit͡sa] is a village in the administrative district of Gmina Chęciny, within Kielce County, Świętokrzyskie Voivodeship, in south-central Poland. It lies approximately 8 km (5 mi) west of Chęciny and 20 km (12 mi) south-west of the regional capital Kielce.
