= Natallia =

Natallia is a feminine given name, a variant form of Natalia.

== People with this given name ==
- Natallia Helakh (born 1978), Belarusian rower
- Natallia Mikhnevich (born 1982), Belarusian shot putter
- Natallia Safronava, née Klimovets (born 1974), Belarusian triple jumper
- Natallia Safronnikava (born 1973), Belarusian sprinter
- Natallia Sazanovich (born 1973), former Belarusian heptathlete
- Natallia Shymchuk (born 1980), female javelin thrower from Belarus
- Natallia Solohub (born 1975), Belarusian sprinter
- Natallia Tryfanava, Belarusian music teacher; won the World Sauna Championships three times
- Natallia Tsylinskaya (born 1975), eight times World Champion track cyclist

== See also ==
- Natalia (disambiguation)
