= Mosty, Świętokrzyskie Voivodeship =

Mosty
- Village
- Location within Poland
- Coordinates: 50°46′55″N 20°24′9″E
- Country: Poland
- Voivodeship: Świętokrzyskie
- County: Kielce
- Gmina: Chęciny
- Population: 130

Mosty [ˈmɔstɨ] is a village in the administrative district of Gmina Chęciny, within Kielce County, Świętokrzyskie Voivodeship, in south-central Poland. It lies approximately 6 km (4 mi) south-west of Chęciny and 19 km (12 mi) south-west of the regional capital Kielce.
