= Tarnowski Młyn =

Tarnowski Młyn may refer to:

- Tarnowski Młyn, Turek County, a village in the administrative district of Gmina Władysławów, Poland
- Tarnowski Młyn, Złotów County, a settlement in the administrative district of Gmina Tarnówka, Poland
