= Skiby =

Village in Poland

- Village
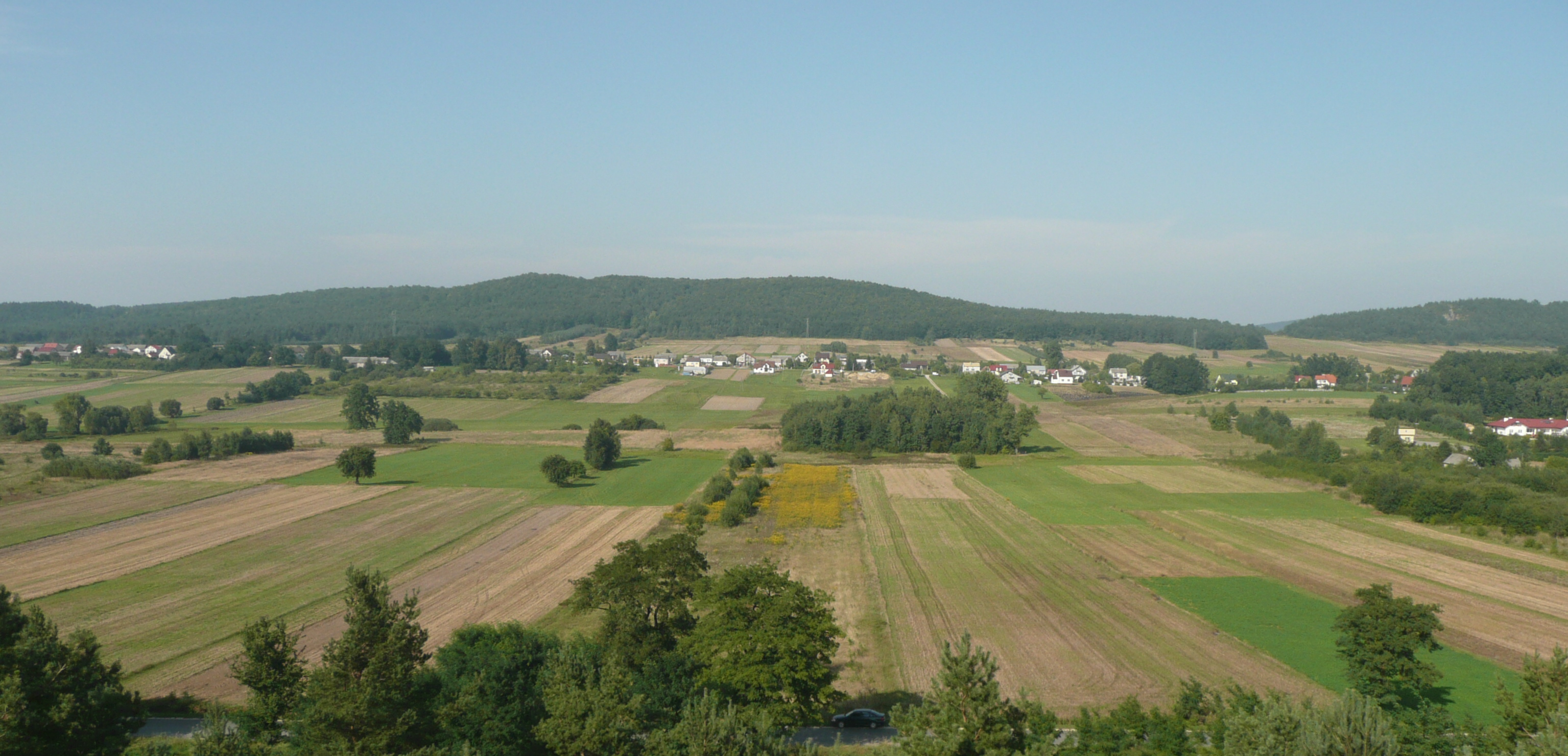

- Location within Poland
- Coordinates: 50°49′7″N 20°26′4″E
- Country: Poland
- Voivodeship: Świętokrzyskie
- County: Kielce
- Gmina: Chęciny
- Population: 360

Skiby [ˈskibɨ] is a village in the administrative district of Gmina Chęciny, within Kielce County, Świętokrzyskie Voivodeship, in south-central Poland. It lies approximately 3 km (2 mi) north-west of Chęciny and 15 km (9 mi) south-west of the regional capital Kielce.
