= Przymiarki =

Przymiarki may refer to the following places:

- Przymiarki, Biłgoraj County in Lublin Voivodeship (east Poland)
- Przymiarki, Gmina Ulhówek, Tomaszów County in Lublin Voivodeship (east Poland)
- Przymiarki, Gmina Urszulin, Włodawa County in Lublin Voivodeship (east Poland)
- Przymiarki, Gmina Wola Uhruska, Włodawa County in Lublin Voivodeship (east Poland)
- Przymiarki, Świętokrzyskie Voivodeship (south-central Poland)
- Przymiarki, Greater Poland Voivodeship (west-central Poland)
- Przymiarki, Gmina Myślibórz, Myślibórz County in West Pomeranian Voivodeship (north-west Poland)
- Przymiarki, Gmina Barlinek, Myślibórz County in West Pomeranian Voivodeship (north-west Poland)
- Przymiarki, Świdwin County in West Pomeranian Voivodeship (north-west Poland)
