= Korzecko =

- Village
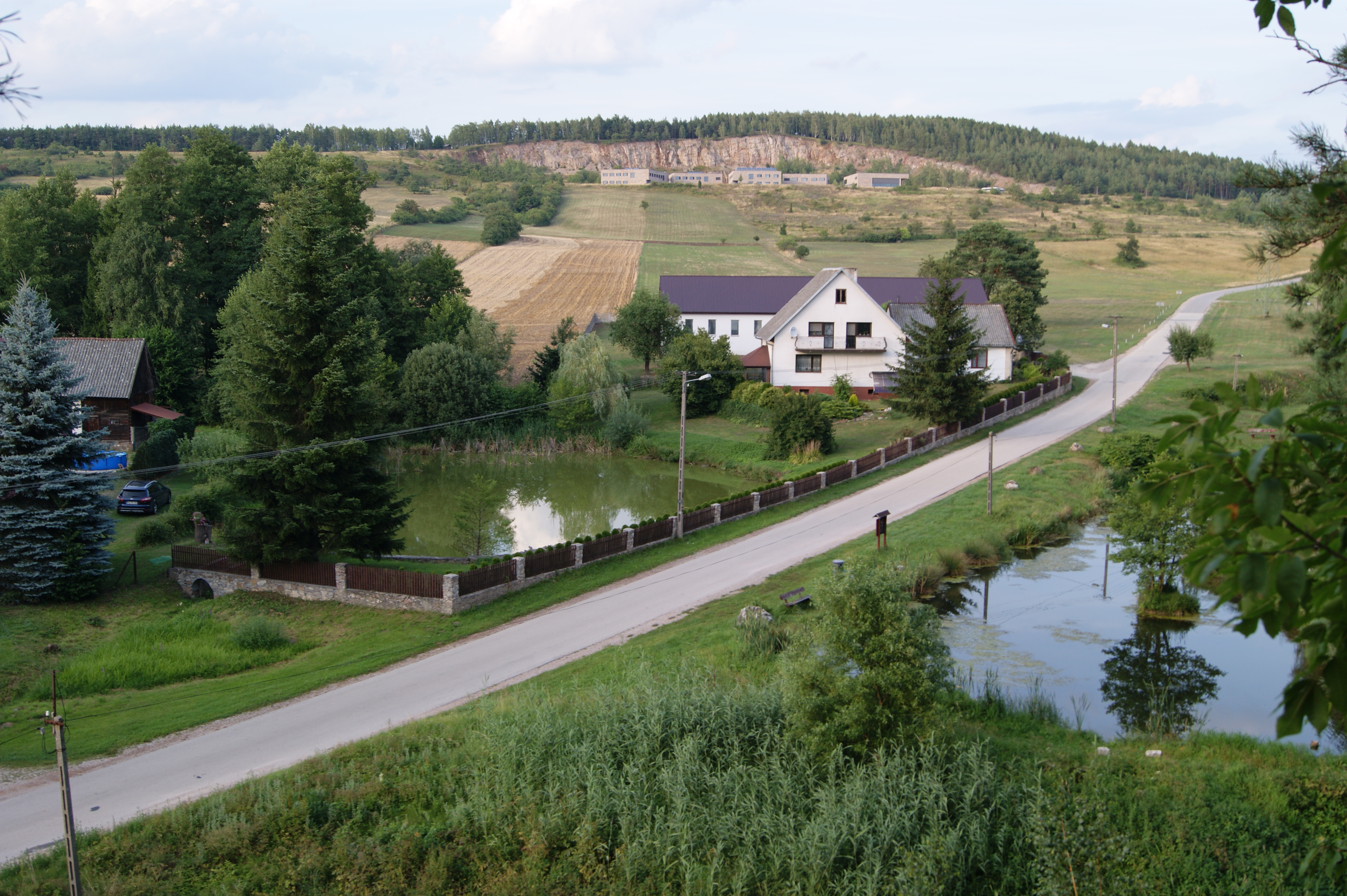
- Eastern end of Korzecko

- Location within Poland
- Coordinates: 50°48′1″N 20°25′23″E
- Country: Poland
- Voivodeship: Świętokrzyskie
- County: Kielce
- Gmina: Chęciny
- Population: 570

Korzecko [kɔˈʐɛt͡skɔ] is a village in the administrative district of Gmina Chęciny, within Kielce County, Świętokrzyskie Voivodeship, in south-central Poland. It lies approximately 4 km (2 mi) west of Chęciny and 17 km (11 mi) south-west of the regional capital Kielce.
