= Podpolichno =

- Village
- Location within Poland
- Coordinates: 50°49′31″N 20°22′41″E
- Country: Poland
- Voivodeship: Świętokrzyskie
- County: Kielce
- Gmina: Chęciny
- Population: 180

Podpolichno [pɔtpɔˈlixnɔ] is a village in the administrative district of Gmina Chęciny, within Kielce County, Świętokrzyskie Voivodeship, in south-central Poland. It lies approximately 7 km (4 mi) west of Chęciny and 18 km (11 mi) west of the regional capital Kielce.
