= Miedzianka =

Miedzianka may refer to the following places in Poland:

- Miedzianka, Lower Silesian Voivodeship (south-west Poland)
- Miedzianka, Świętokrzyskie Voivodeship (south-central Poland)
