= Lipowica, Świętokrzyskie Voivodeship =

Lipowica
- Village
- Location within Poland
- Coordinates: 50°46′40″N 20°30′41″E
- Country: Poland
- Voivodeship: Świętokrzyskie
- County: Kielce
- Gmina: Chęciny
- Population: 320

Lipowica [lipɔˈvit͡sa] is a village in the administrative district of Gmina Chęciny, within Kielce County, Świętokrzyskie Voivodeship, in south-central Poland. It lies approximately 5 km (3 mi) south-east of Chęciny and 14 km (9 mi) south-west of the regional capital Kielce.
