= Łukowa =

Łukowa may refer to the following places:

- Łukowa, Lesser Poland Voivodeship (south Poland)
- Łukowa, Lublin Voivodeship (east Poland)
- Łukowa, Świętokrzyskie Voivodeship (south-central Poland)
- Łukowa, Subcarpathian Voivodeship (south-east Poland)
