= Bolmin =

- Village
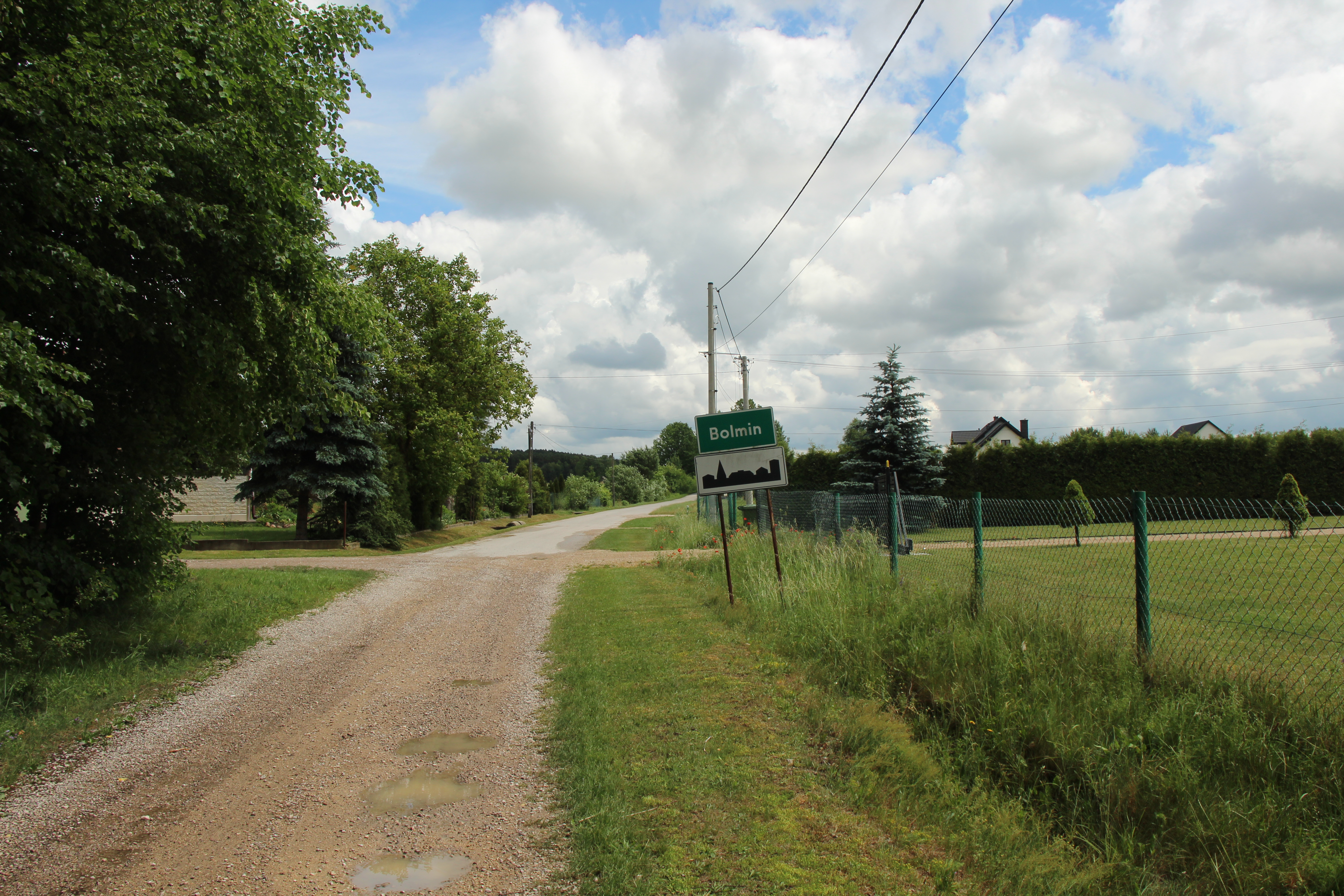

- Location within Poland
- Coordinates: 50°48′29″N 20°21′6″E
- Country: Poland
- Voivodeship: Świętokrzyskie
- County: Kielce
- Gmina: Chęciny

Population
  - Total: 1,170

Bolmin [ˈbɔlmin] is a village in the administrative district of Gmina Chęciny, within Kielce County, Świętokrzyskie Voivodeship, in south-central Poland. It lies approximately 9 km (6 mi) west of Chęciny and 21 km (13 mi) south-west of the regional capital Kielce.

== History ==
In 1688, the village was owned by Aleksander Strzyzowski of the clan Gozdawa.

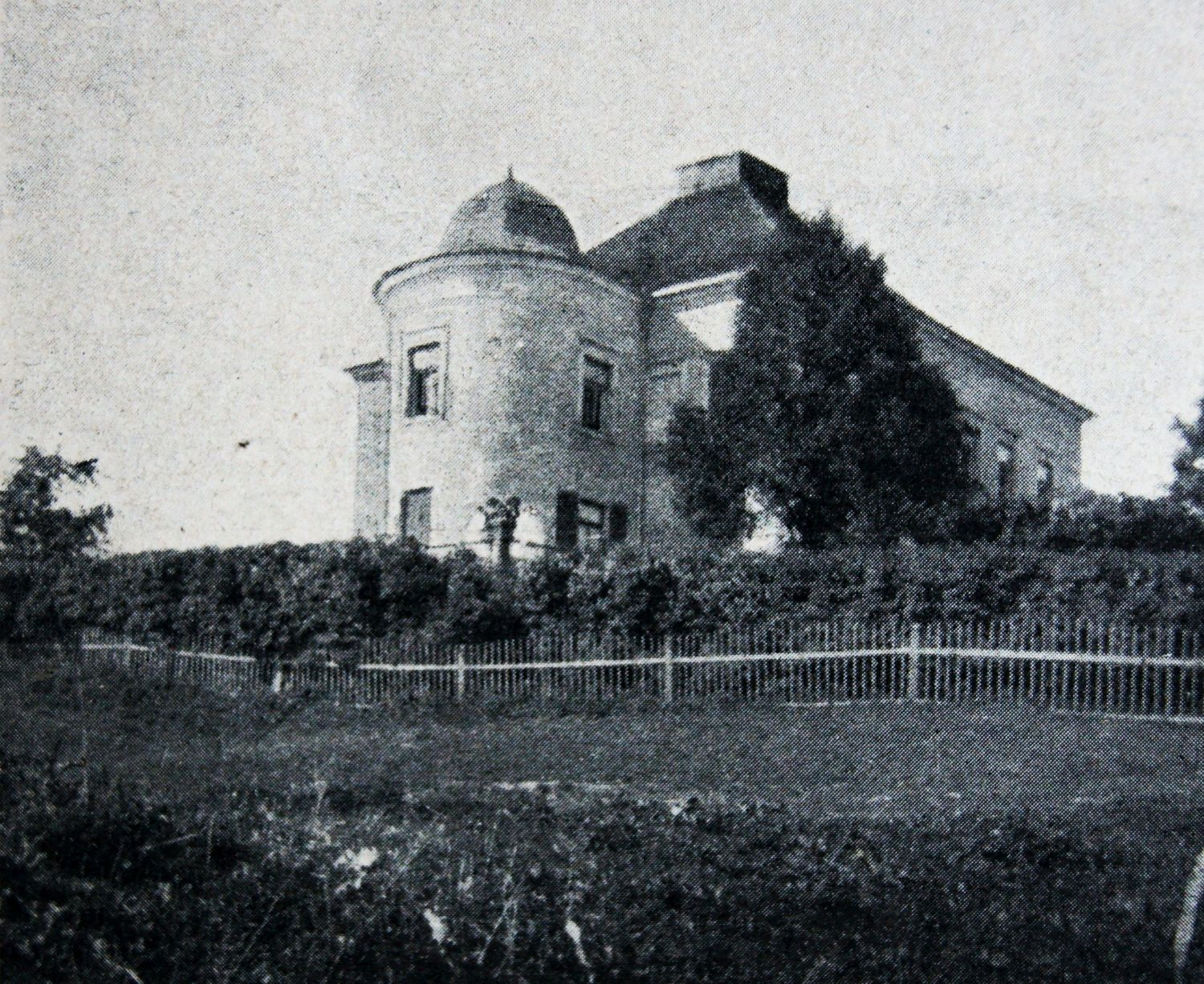
Manor house, 1906

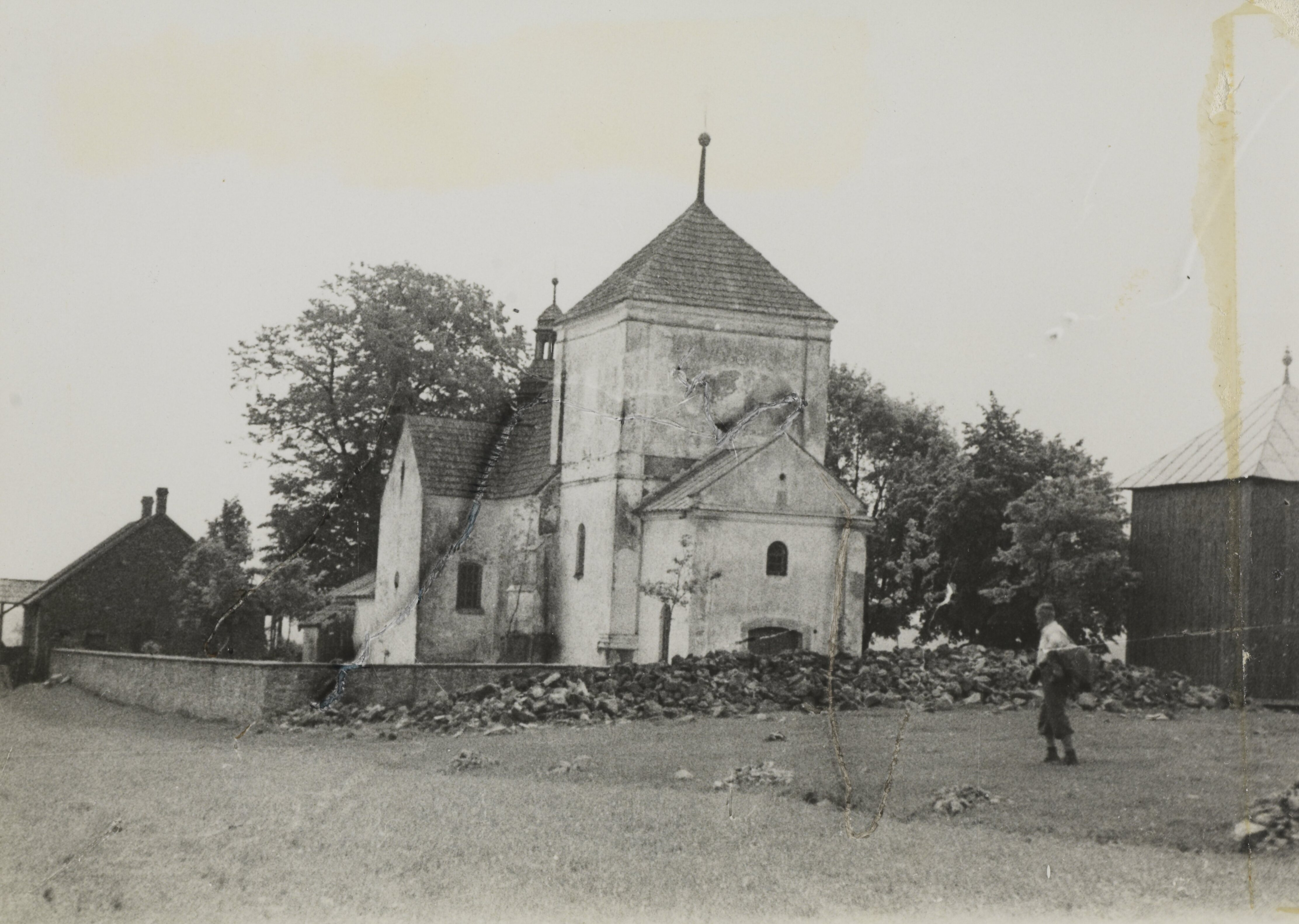
Church in Bolmin, 1936
