= Radkowice, Kielce County =

Radkowice
- Village
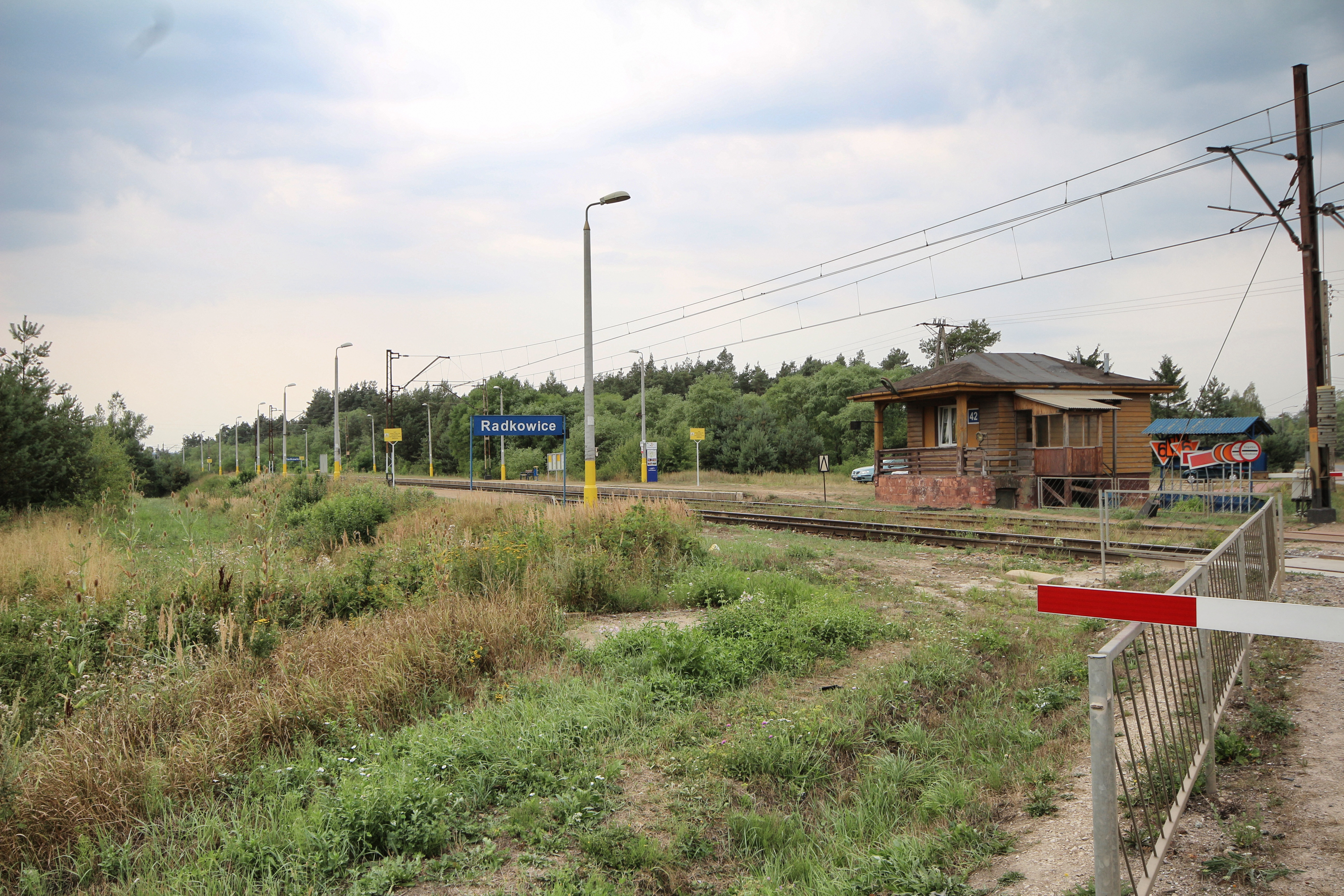
- Railway stop

- Location within Poland
- Coordinates: 50°47′25″N 20°29′32″E
- Country: Poland
- Voivodeship: Świętokrzyskie
- County: Kielce
- Gmina: Chęciny
- Population: 600

Radkowice [ratkɔˈvit͡sɛ] is a village in the administrative district of Gmina Chęciny, within Kielce County, Świętokrzyskie Voivodeship, in south-central Poland. It lies approximately 3 km (2 mi) south-east of Chęciny and 14 km (9 mi) south-west of the regional capital Kielce.
