= Starochęciny =

- Village
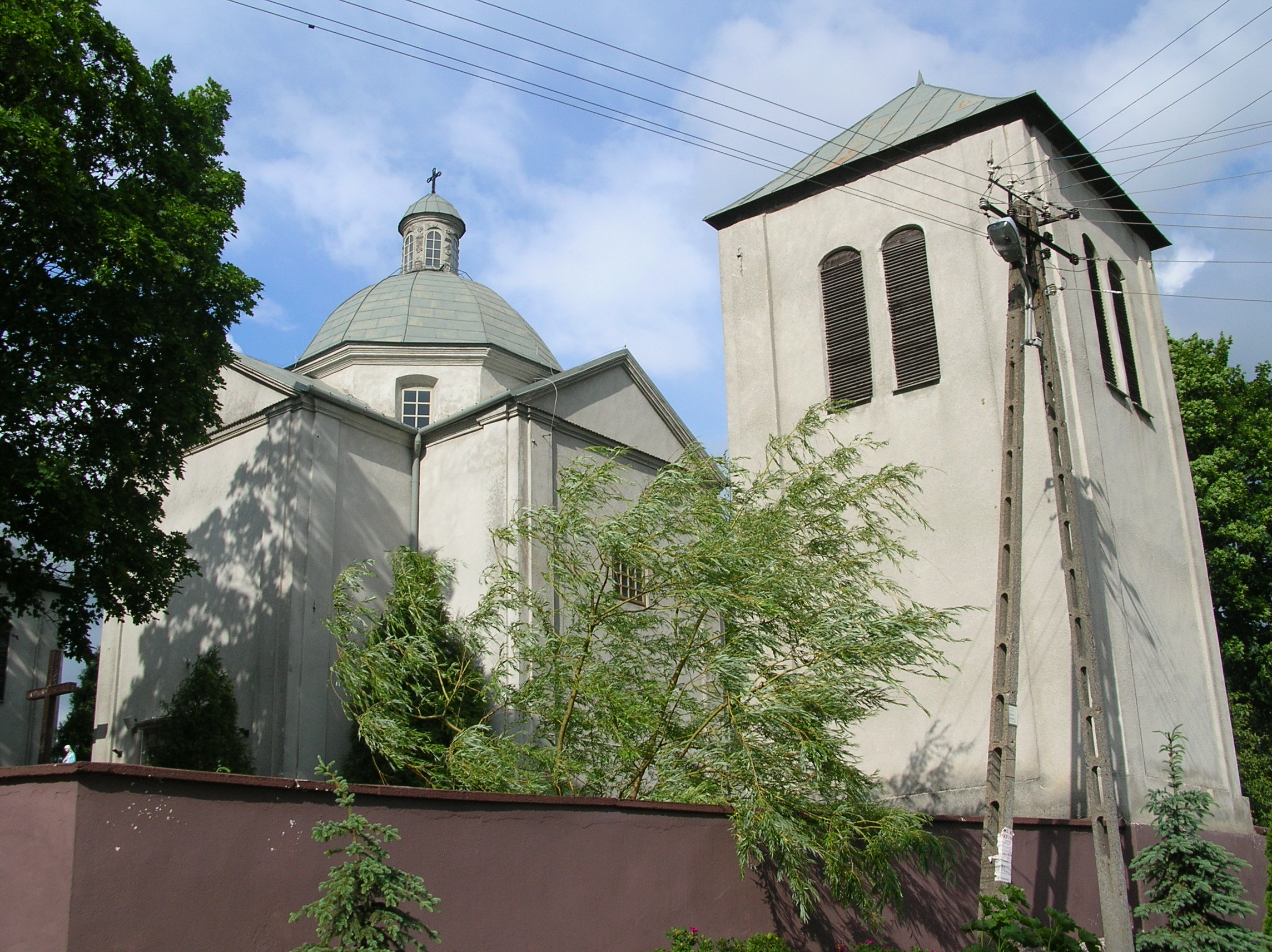
- Catholic church

- Location within Poland
- Coordinates: 50°46′48″N 20°28′43″E
- Country: Poland
- Voivodeship: Świętokrzyskie
- County: Kielce
- Gmina: Chęciny
- Population: 680

Starochęciny [starɔxɛnˈt͡ɕinɨ] is a village in the administrative district of Gmina Chęciny, within Kielce County, Świętokrzyskie Voivodeship, in south-central Poland. It lies approximately 3 km (2 mi) south of Chęciny and 16 km (10 mi) south-west of the regional capital Kielce.
