= Adam Gurowski =

Polish journalist, essayist, reformer, historian, lecturer, translator

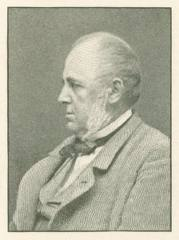
Photograph of Adam Gurowski.

Count Adam Gurowski (September 10, 1805, in Russocice near Kalisz, Poland – May 4, 1866, in Washington, D.C.) was a Polish-born writer who emigrated to the United States in 1849.

== Life and career ==
Gurowski was a son of Count Władysław Gurowski, an ardent admirer of Tadeusz Kościuszko. Having been expelled in 1818 and again in 1819 from the gymnasia of Warsaw and Kalisz for revolutionary demonstrations, young Gurowski continued his studies at various German universities. He studied under Hegel at Berlin University and obtained a degree from Heidelberg University.

Returning to Warsaw in 1825, he became identified with those opposed to Russian influence, and was in consequence several times imprisoned. He was active in organizing the November uprising of 1830, in which he afterward took part. On its suppression, Gurowski lost the greater part of his estates and escaped to France, where he lived for several years. While there he became associated with the Saint-Simonians, and adopted many of the views of Charles Fourier. He helped found the Polish Democratic Society (TDP) in Paris. The remainder of his estates had in the meantime been confiscated and he had been condemned to death.

Gurowski experienced a total change of heart on the question of Polish nationalism and abjectly pleaded with Tsarist authorities for a pardon. Norman Davies writes: "...he somehow saw Russian autocracy as an ideal instrument for social and cultural modernization. He savagely denounced the conceited, uncaring individualism of the Polish nobles, and gave practical proof of his sincerity by denouncing his disaffected neighbours to the Tsarist police. He even submitted a memorandum on educational reform, which proposed that the Polish language - 'a degenerate dialect of Russian' - should be replaced in Polish schools by Old Church Slavonic".

Gurowski married Theresa de Zbijewska in 1827. They had two children. Theresa died in 1832.

In 1835, Gurowski published a work entitled La vérité sur la Russie, in which he advocated a union of the different branches of the Slavic race. The book being favorably regarded by the Russian government, Gurowski was recalled, and, although his estates were not restored, he was employed in the civil service. In 1843, the Marquis de Custine, lover of Gurowski's brother Ignacy, published La Russie en 1839, a polemical travelogue focusing on the Russian Empire. In 1844, finding that he had many powerful enemies at court, Gurowski left secretly for Berlin and went thence to Heidelberg. Here he gave himself to study, and for two years lectured on political economy in the University of Bern, Switzerland. He then went to Italy.

In 1849, Gurowski went to the United States, where he engaged in literary pursuits and became deeply interested in American politics. He wrote articles for the American Cyclopaedia and worked on the editorial staff of the New York Tribune. During the Crimean War he sided with Russia, and his editorials and pamphlets were an effective influence on American public opinion in favor of Russia. He was strongly opposed to slavery.

In the lead-up to the inauguration of Lincoln as president, Gurowski met with pro-Union Republicans in Washington who were delegates to the "Peace Conference," warning them of secessionist plots to disrupt the electoral college, and of Southern intentions to foment takeover of the government either at the time electoral ballots were counted or on March 4, inauguration day.

From 1861 to 1863, he was translator in the State Department in Washington D.C., being acquainted with eight languages. In 1862, he published the first volume of his three-volume Diary, which included three categories of men: Praise, Half and Half, and Blame. President Abraham Lincoln merited the Praise column, as did Edwin M. Stanton and poet Walt Whitman, but otherwise Gurowski was highly critical of officials in the Lincoln administration.

William O'Connor, who translated some of the count's papers into English, described him as "a madman with lucid intervals." Whitman wrote, "He knew every thing & growled & found fault with everybody—but was always very courteous to me."

Count Gurowski died in May 1866 and was buried in Congressional Cemetery. Whitman considered the tempestuous count a friend and attended his funeral. "His funeral was simple but very impressive—all the big radicals were there," Whitman wrote.

== Works ==
- La civilisation et la Russie (St. Petersburg, 1840)
- Russland und die Civilisation (Übersetzer: Alvensleben) (Leipzig, 1841)
- Pensées sur l'avenir des Polonais (Berlin, 1841)
- Aus meinem Gedankenbuche (Breslau, 1843)
- Eine Tour durch Belgien (Heidelberg, 1845)
- Impressions et souvenirs (Lausanne, 1846)
- Die letzten Ereignisse in den drei Theilen des alten Polen (The latest events in the three parts of old Poland; Munich, 1846)
- Le Panslavisme (Florence, 1848)
- Russia as it Is (New York, 1854)
- The Turkish Question (1854)
- A Year of the War (1855)
- America and Europe (1857)
- Slavery in History (1860)
- My Diary, notes on the Civil War (3 vols., 1862–66)
