= Gościniec, Świętokrzyskie Voivodeship =

Gościniec
- Village
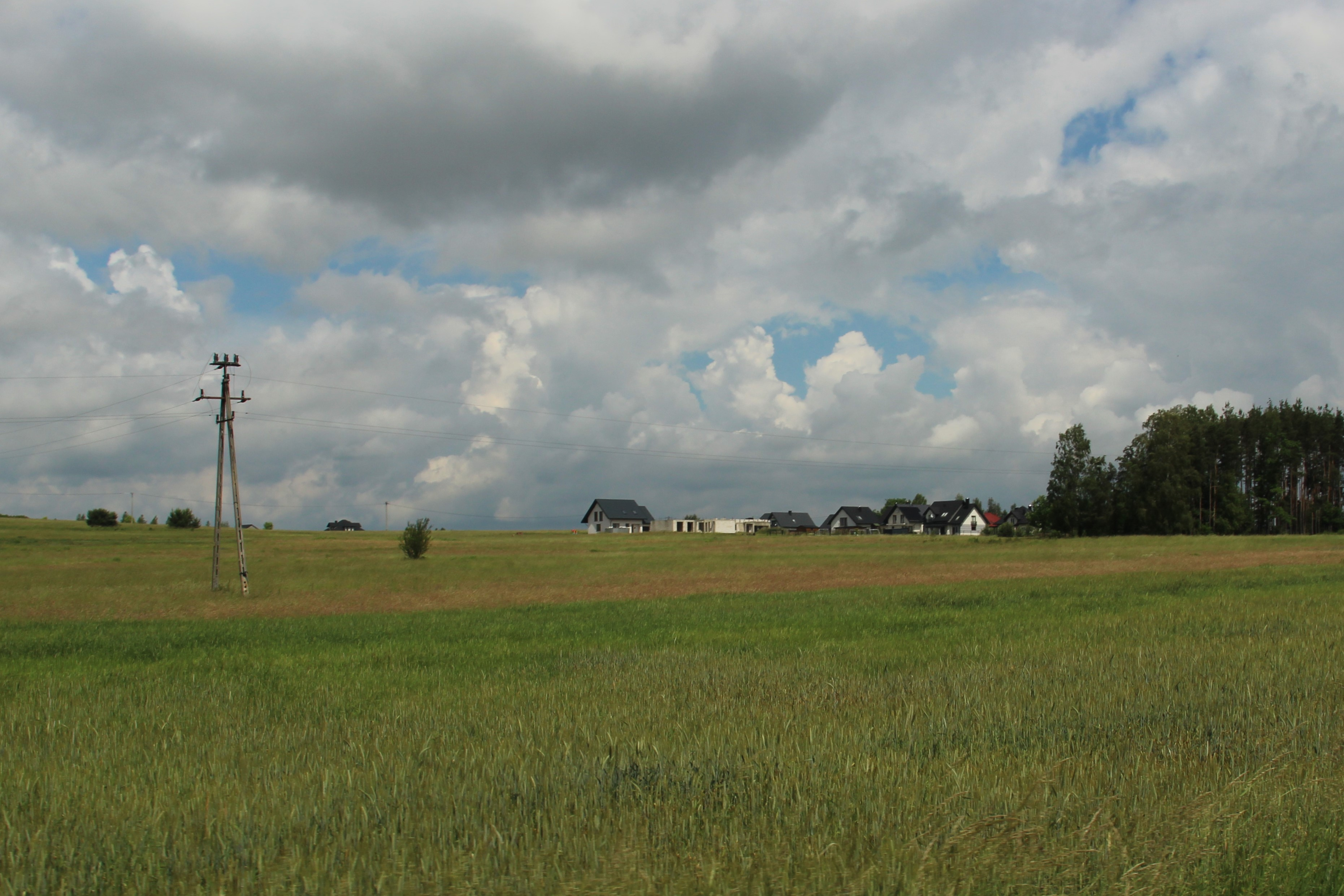

- Location within Poland
- Coordinates: 50°48′54″N 20°25′13″E
- Country: Poland
- Voivodeship: Świętokrzyskie
- County: Kielce
- Gmina: Chęciny
- Population: 150

Gościniec (Polish pronunciation: [ɡɔɕˈt͡ɕiɲɛt͡s]) is a village in the administrative district of Gmina Chęciny, within Kielce County, Świętokrzyskie Voivodeship, in south-central Poland. It lies approximately 4 km (2 mi) west of Chęciny and 16 km (10 mi) south-west of the regional capital Kielce.
