= Siedlce, Świętokrzyskie Voivodeship =

Siedlce
- Village
- Location within Poland
- Coordinates: 50°44′42″N 20°29′27″E
- Country: Poland
- Voivodeship: Świętokrzyskie
- County: Kielce
- Gmina: Chęciny
- Population: 610

Siedlce [ˈɕɛdlt͡sɛ] is a village in the administrative district of Gmina Chęciny, within Kielce County, Świętokrzyskie Voivodeship, in south-central Poland. It lies approximately 7 km (4 mi) south of Chęciny and 18 km (11 mi) south-west of the regional capital Kielce.
