= Leonia (disambiguation) =

Leonia, New Jersey is a borough in Bergen County, New Jersey, United States.

Leonia may also refer to:

- Leonia (gastropod), a genus of gastropods in the family Pomatiidae
- Leonia (plant), a genus of plants in the family Violaceae
- Leonia, Greater Poland Voivodeship, a village in Poland
- Leonia, Idaho, a community in Idaho, United States
- Leonia Janecka otherwise Leonia Nadelman (1909–2003), Polish painter
- Leonia Touroff, birth name of Eleanor Glueck (1898–1972), American social worker and criminologist
