= Ostrów, Kielce County =

Ostrów
- Village
- Location within Poland
- Coordinates: 50°45′10″N 20°31′32″E
- Country: Poland
- Voivodeship: Świętokrzyskie
- County: Kielce
- Gmina: Chęciny
- Population: 610

Ostrów [ˈɔstruf] is a village in the administrative district of Gmina Chęciny, within Kielce County, Świętokrzyskie Voivodeship, in south-central Poland. It lies approximately 7 km (4 mi) south-east of Chęciny and 16 km (10 mi) south-west of the regional capital Kielce.
