= Paradise Cave =

Cave and archaeological site in Poland

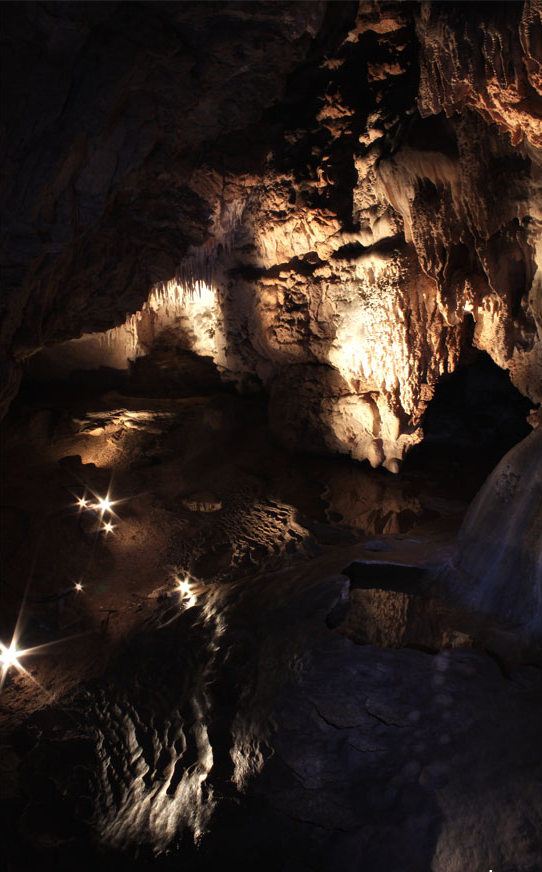
- Paradise Cave interior

- Location within Poland
- Location: Gmina Chęciny, powiat kielecki, województwo świętokrzyskie, Poland
- Coordinates: 50°49′22″N 20°30′12″E
- Depth: 8 to 17.5 m (26 to 57 ft)
- Length: 240 m (790 ft)
- Discovery: Józef Kopeć; Feliks Wawrzeńczyk (1963)
- Geology: Karst
- Entrances: 2
- Access: with guide, max. 15 persons per group

Paradise Cave (Polish: Jaskinia Raj, Polish pronunciation: [jas'kʲiɲa raj]) is a horizontal karstic limestone cave located inside the Malik hill, to the south of Kielce, Świętokrzyskie Voivodship, Poland.

It is part of the "Red tourist trail Chęciny - Kielce" in the Świętokrzyskie Mountains (Holy Cross Mountains).

== Description ==
The cave has a length of 240 m (790 ft) and vertical range of 9.5 m (31 ft) however, only a section of 180 m (590 ft) length and two entrances are open to visitors. Despite its small size it is regarded as one of Poland's most beautiful caves and attracts numerous visitors. Its corridors lead through five chambers and caverns, that are ornamented with speleothems, such as stalactites, stalagmites and columns of calcified rock deposited over tens of thousands of years. In order to maintain an internal temperature of 8 to 10 °C (46 to 50 °F; 281 to 283 K) and 95 percent humidity required to preserve the cave's historical value and ecological integrity a maximum of fifteen people accompanied by a guide are admitted to enter the cave every fifteen minutes. In front of the entrance is an info center illuminated by optical fiber, that exhibits the cave's archaeological and paleontological discoveries that include a replica of a Neanderthal camp, Mousterian assemblages and fossilized bones of contemporary Paleolithic fauna.

== Archaeology ==
=== History ===
The cave was discovered in 1963 by Józef Kopeć and Feliks Wawrzeńczak, students of a local technical school. After extensive research and documentation by Tymoteusz Wróblewski and Zbigniew Rubinowski, geologists at the Świętokrzyskie branch of the Polish Geological Institute it was opened to the public in 1972.

=== Discoveries ===
The limestones the cave formed in, date from the Middle Devonian epoch, approximately 350 million years ago. In the sub-recent cave deposits, there are traces of occupancy by Neanderthal dating back to the late Pleistocene, 50 to 60 thousand years ago. Remains and fossils of Cave hyena and cave bear, that inhabited the cave and countless bones of mammalian species, such as Woolly rhinoceros and mammoths were unearthed at the site.
