= Wojkowiec =

- Village
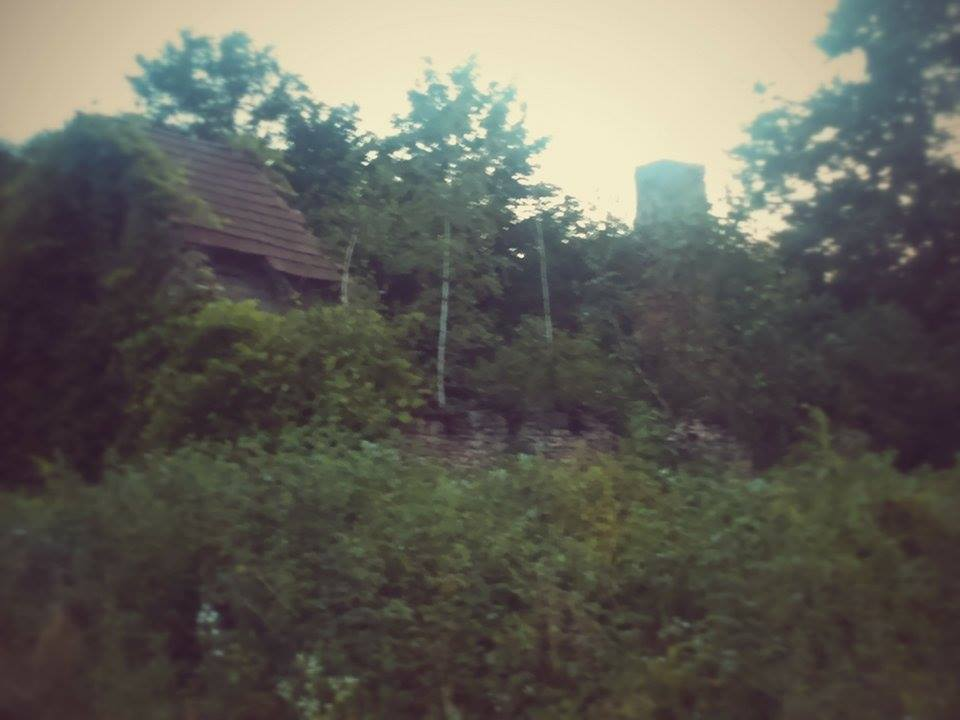

- Location within Poland
- Coordinates: 50°43′57″N 20°30′11″E
- Country: Poland
- Voivodeship: Świętokrzyskie
- County: Kielce
- Gmina: Chęciny

Wojkowiec [vɔi̯ˈkɔvjɛt͡s] is a village in the administrative district of Gmina Chęciny, within Kielce County, Świętokrzyskie Voivodeship, in south-central Poland. It lies approximately 9 km (6 mi) south of Chęciny and 19 km (12 mi) south-west of the regional capital Kielce.
