= Chylin, Greater Poland Voivodeship =

Chylin
- Village
- Location within Poland
- Coordinates: 52°7′1″N 18°26′7″E
- Country: Poland
- Voivodeship: Greater Poland
- County: Turek
- Gmina: Władysławów
- Population: 808

Chylin [ˈxɨlin] is a village in the administrative district of Gmina Władysławów, within Turek County, Greater Poland Voivodeship, in west-central Poland.
