= Gmina Władysławów =

Gmina Władysławów Władysławów Commune
- Gmina
- Coat of arms

- Coordinates (Władysławów): 52°6′10″N 18°28′18″E
- Country: Poland
- Voivodeship: Greater Poland
- County: Turek
- Seat: Władysławów

Area
  - Total: 90.71 km^{2} (35.02 sq mi)

Population (2006)
  - Total: 7,807
  - Density: 86.07/km^{2} (222.9/sq mi)
- Time zone: UTC+1 (CET)
  - Summer (DST): UTC+2 (CEST)
- Vehicle registration: PTU
- Website: http://www.wladyslawow.pl

Gmina Władysławów is a rural gmina (administrative district) in Turek County, Greater Poland Voivodeship, in central Poland. Its seat is the village of Władysławów, which lies approximately 10 kilometres (6 mi) north of Turek and 111 km (69 mi) east of the regional capital Poznań.

The gmina covers an area of 90.71 square kilometres (35.0 sq mi), and as of 2006 its total population is 7,807.

== Villages ==
Gmina Władysławów contains the villages and settlements of Beznazwa, Chylin, Emerytka, Felicjanów, Głogowa, Jabłonna, Józefów, Kamionka, Kuny, Leonia, Małoszyna, Mariantów, Międzylesie, Milinów, Natalia, Olesin, Piorunów, Polichno, Przemysławów, Przyborów, Russocice, Skarbki, Stawki, Stefania, Tarnowski Młyn, Wandów, Władysławów and Wyszyna.

== Neighbouring gminas ==
Gmina Władysławów is bordered by the gminas of Brudzew, Kościelec, Krzymów, Tuliszków and Turek.
