= Władysławów, Greater Poland Voivodeship =

Władysławów
- Village
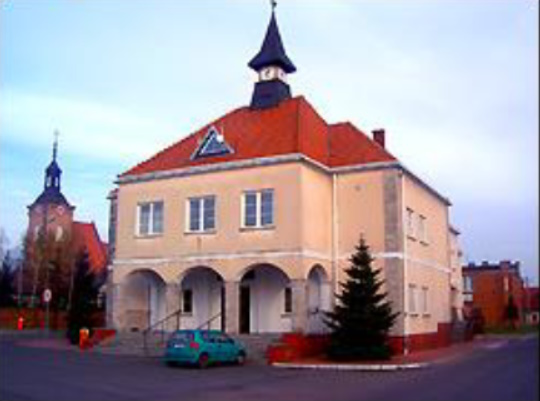

- Location within Poland
- Coordinates: 52°6′N 18°28′E
- Country: Poland
- Voivodeship: Greater Poland
- County: Turek
- Gmina: Władysławów
- Population: 1,625
- Time zone: UTC+1 (CET)
  - Summer (DST): UTC+2 (CEST)
- Vehicle registration: PTU
- Website: http://www.wladyslawow.pl

Władysławów [vwadɨˈswavuf] is a village in Turek County, Greater Poland Voivodeship, in west-central Poland. It is the seat of the gmina (administrative district) called Gmina Władysławów.

== History ==
Władysławów was granted town rights in 1727 as a private town of Polish nobility, administratively located in the Kalisz Voivodeship in the Greater Poland Province of the Polish Crown. It was annexed by Prussia in the Second Partition of Poland in 1793. In 1807 it was regained by Poles and included within the short-lived Duchy of Warsaw, and in 1815 it fell to the Russian Partition of Poland. As punishment for the unsuccessful Polish January Uprising the tsarist administration stripped Władysławów of its town rights in 1870. Władysławów was eventually restored to Poland when the country regained independence in 1918 following World War I.

During the German occupation (World War II), inhabitants of Władysławów were among Poles murdered by the Germans on 20 September 1939, in nearby Turek. The local school principal was among Polish teachers and principals murdered in the Mauthausen concentration camp. Almost all of its pre-war Jewish population of 200 or so was murdered in the Holocaust. After being terrorized and robbed by the occupying Germans and their local Polish helpers, in 1941 most were transported to a rural ghetto near Kowale Pańskie, and then in 1942 to the Chełmno extermination camp where they were gassed. In 1942, Nazi Germany carried out expulsions of Poles, whose farms were then handed over to German colonists as part of the Lebensraum policy.

== Notable people ==
- Andrzej Rosicki (1814–1904), Polish local official, mayor of Sochaczew and Łódź
- Henryk Leopold Bartsch (1832–1899), Polish pastor and translator
- Roman Chojnacki (1879–1938), Polish conductor
- Oskar Bartel (1893–1873), Polish historian
