= Chęciny Castle =

Abandoned castle in Poland

Coordinates: 50°47′50″N 20°27′37″E

Chęciny Royal Castle
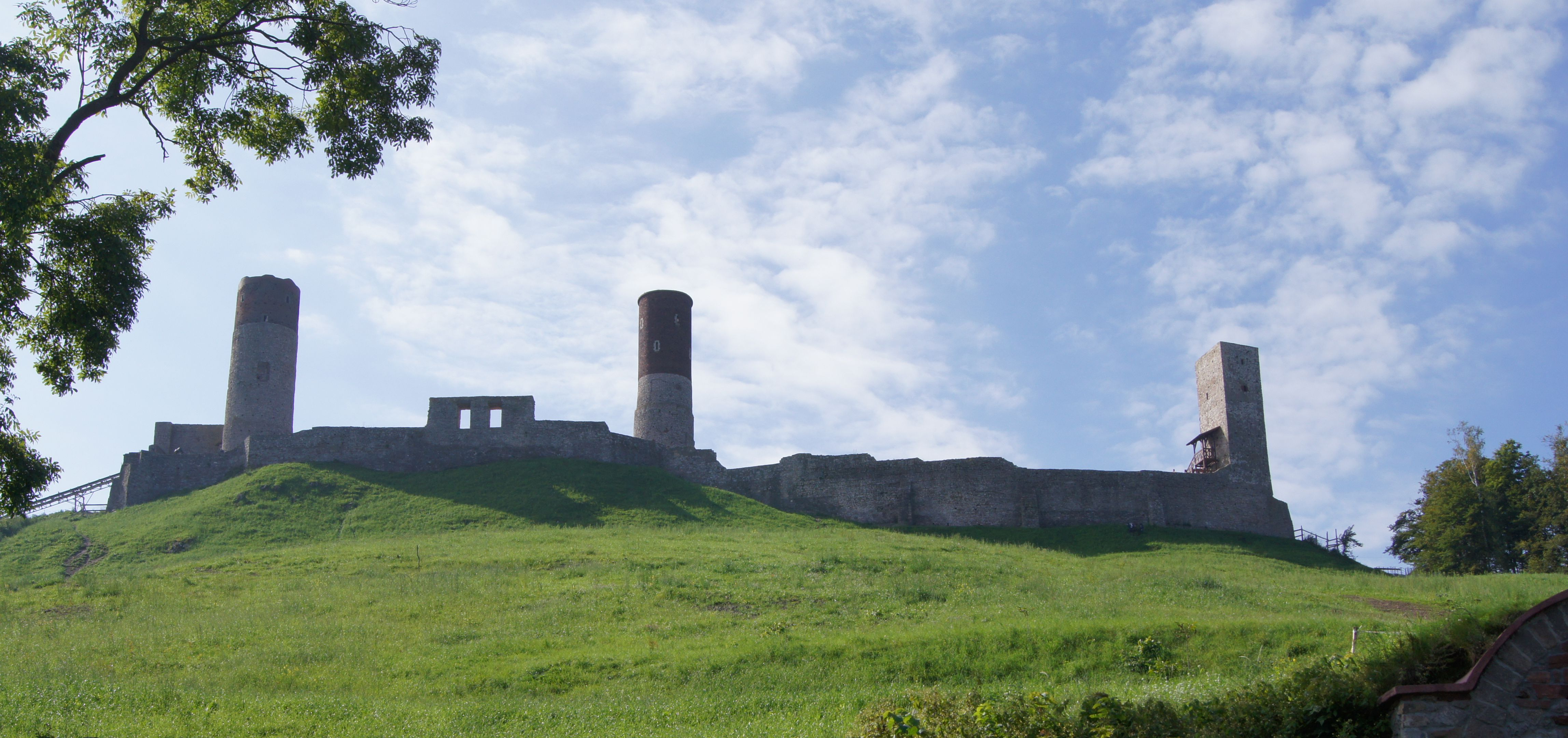
- Interactive map of the Chęciny Royal Castle area

General information
- Architectural style: Polish Gothic
- Location: Chęciny, Poland
- Construction started: 13th century
- Completed: before 1280
- Demolished: 1607, 1655-1657, 1707

Chęciny Royal Castle was built in the late 13th century in Chęciny, Poland. It fell into ruin in the 18th century and remains in that state to this day.

== History ==
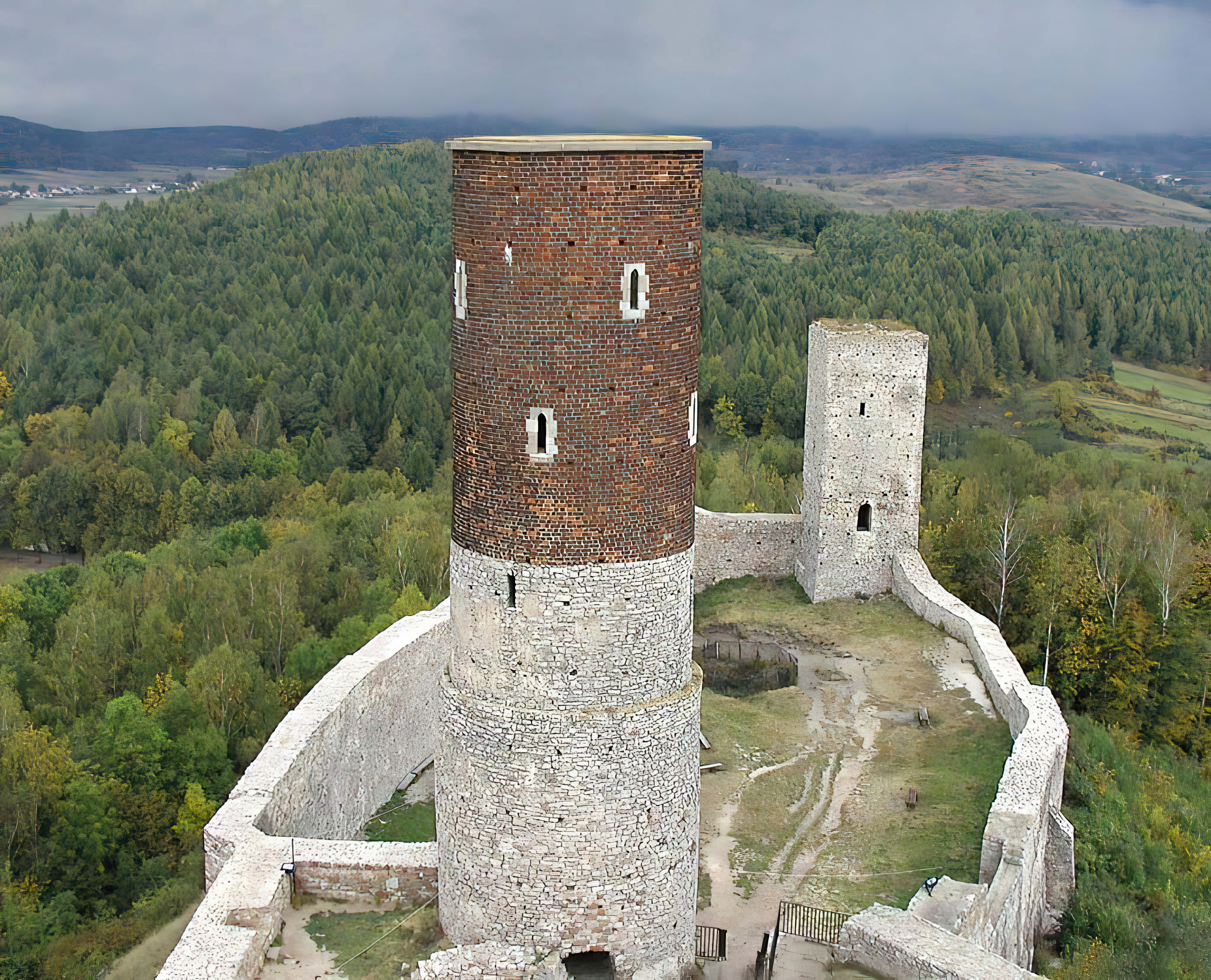
View from the castle tower

The construction of the fortress probably began in the late 13th century. It is certain that the castle existed in 1306, when king Władysław I the Elbow-high gave it to the Archbishop of Kraków, Jan Muskata. A year later, under the pretext of detection of a plot against the royal power, the castle returned to the king. It played a significant role as a place of concentration of troops departing for war with the Teutonic Knights. After the death of Władysław the Elbow-high the stronghold was enlarged by Casimir III the Great. At that time Chęciny become a residence of the king's second wife Adelaide of Hesse. In following years it was also a residence of Elisabeth of Poland, Queen of Hungary, Sophia of Halshany and her son Władysław III of Varna and Bona Sforza. Later it was used for many years as a state prison. Among imprisoned here were Michael Küchmeister von Sternberg future Grand Master of the Teutonic Knights, Andrzej Wingold, Jogaila's half-brother and Warcisław of Gotartowice.

In the second half of the 16th century, the castle began to decline. In 1588 the parliament ordered to transfer the castle's inventories to the Chęciny Church and in 1607, during the Zebrzydowski Rebellion the fortifications and buildings were partially destroyed and burned. The castle briefly regained its former glory due to reconstruction initiated by Stanisław Branicki, starost of Chęciny, but in 1655-1657 it was almost completely destroyed by Swedish-Brandenburgian and Transylvanian troops. The destruction was completed in 1707 during another Swedish occupation. Then, the last residents left the castle. Over the next century the medieval walls become a source of building material for local villagers.

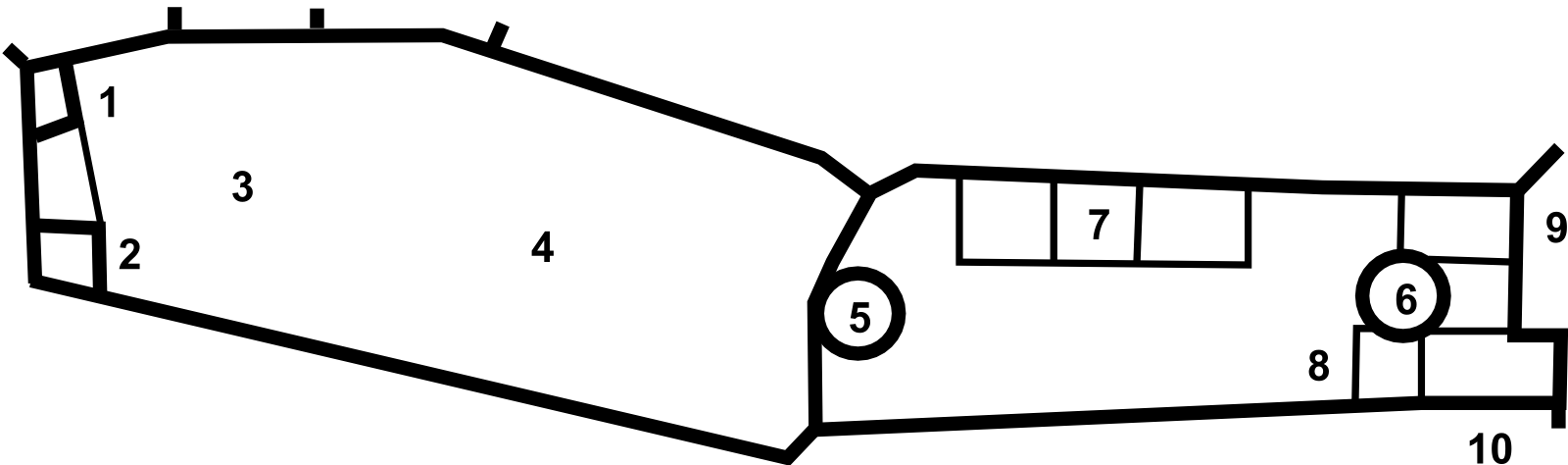
Map of the castle

== See also ==
- Castles in Poland
