= Kamionka, Turek County =

Kamionka
- Village
- Location within Poland
- Coordinates: 52°07′36″N 18°27′20″E
- Country: Poland
- Voivodeship: Greater Poland
- County: Turek
- Gmina: Władysławów

Kamionka [kaˈmjɔnka] is a village in the administrative district of Gmina Władysławów, within Turek County, Greater Poland Voivodeship, in west-central Poland.
