= Wandów, Greater Poland Voivodeship =

Wandów
- Village
- Location within Poland
- Coordinates: 52°5′33″N 18°28′38″E
- Country: Poland
- Voivodeship: Greater Poland
- County: Turek
- Gmina: Władysławów

Wandów [ˈvanduf] is a village in the administrative district of Gmina Władysławów, within Turek County, Greater Poland Voivodeship, in west-central Poland.
