= Emerytka, Greater Poland Voivodeship =

Emerytka
- Village
- Location within Poland
- Coordinates: 52°5′7″N 18°28′5″E
- Country: Poland
- Voivodeship: Greater Poland
- County: Turek
- Gmina: Władysławów
- Population: 176

Emerytka [ɛmɛˈrɨtka] is a village in the administrative district of Gmina Władysławów, within Turek County, Greater Poland Voivodeship, in west-central Poland.
