= Polichno, Kielce County =

Polichno
- Village
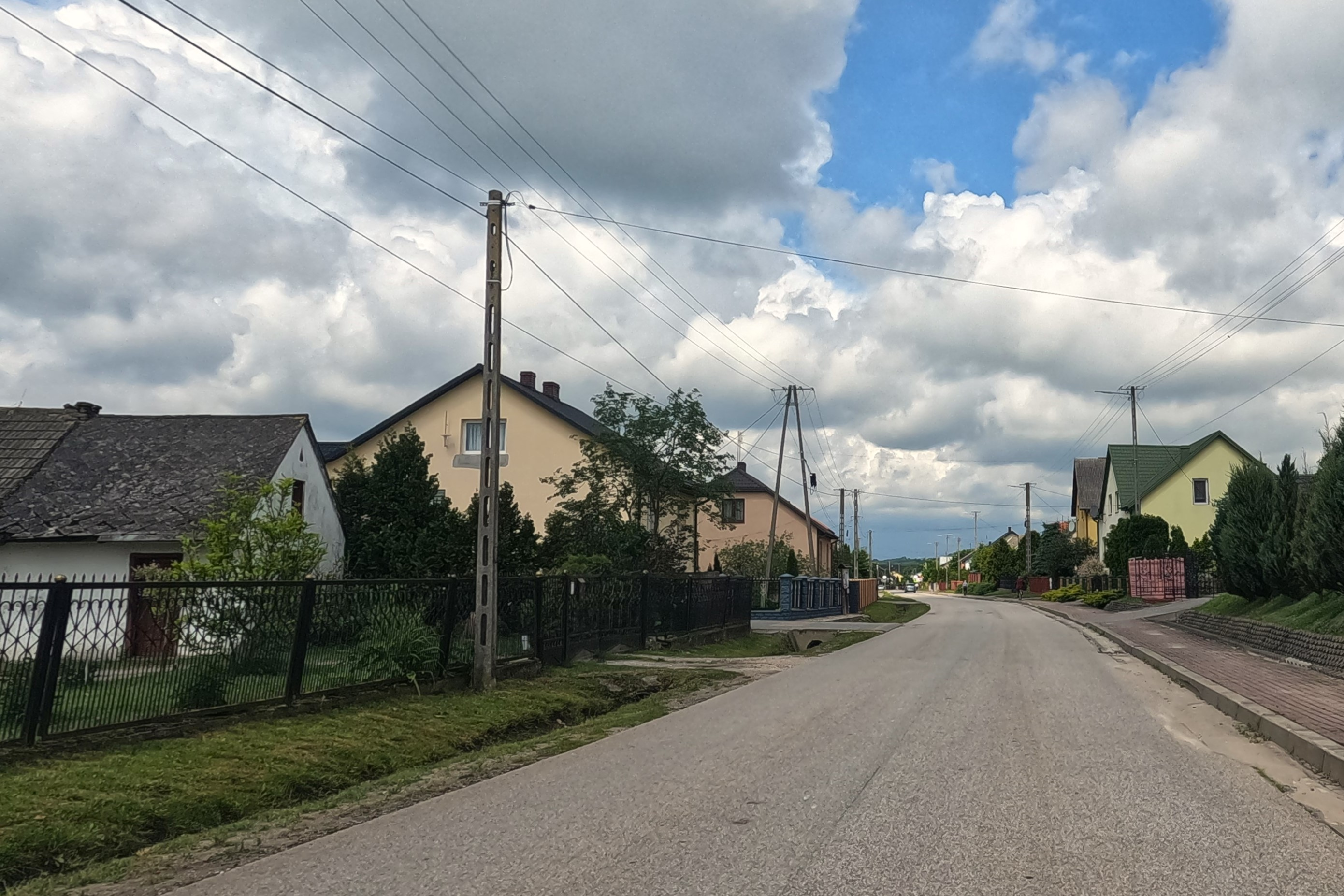

- Location within Poland
- Coordinates: 50°49′3″N 20°23′57″E
- Country: Poland
- Voivodeship: Świętokrzyskie
- County: Kielce
- Gmina: Chęciny
- Population: 800

Polichno [pɔˈlixnɔ] is a village in the administrative district of Gmina Chęciny, within Kielce County, Świętokrzyskie Voivodeship, in south-central Poland. It lies approximately 6 km (4 mi) west of Chęciny and 17 km (11 mi) south-west of the regional capital Kielce.
