= Łukowa, Świętokrzyskie Voivodeship =

Łukowa
- Village
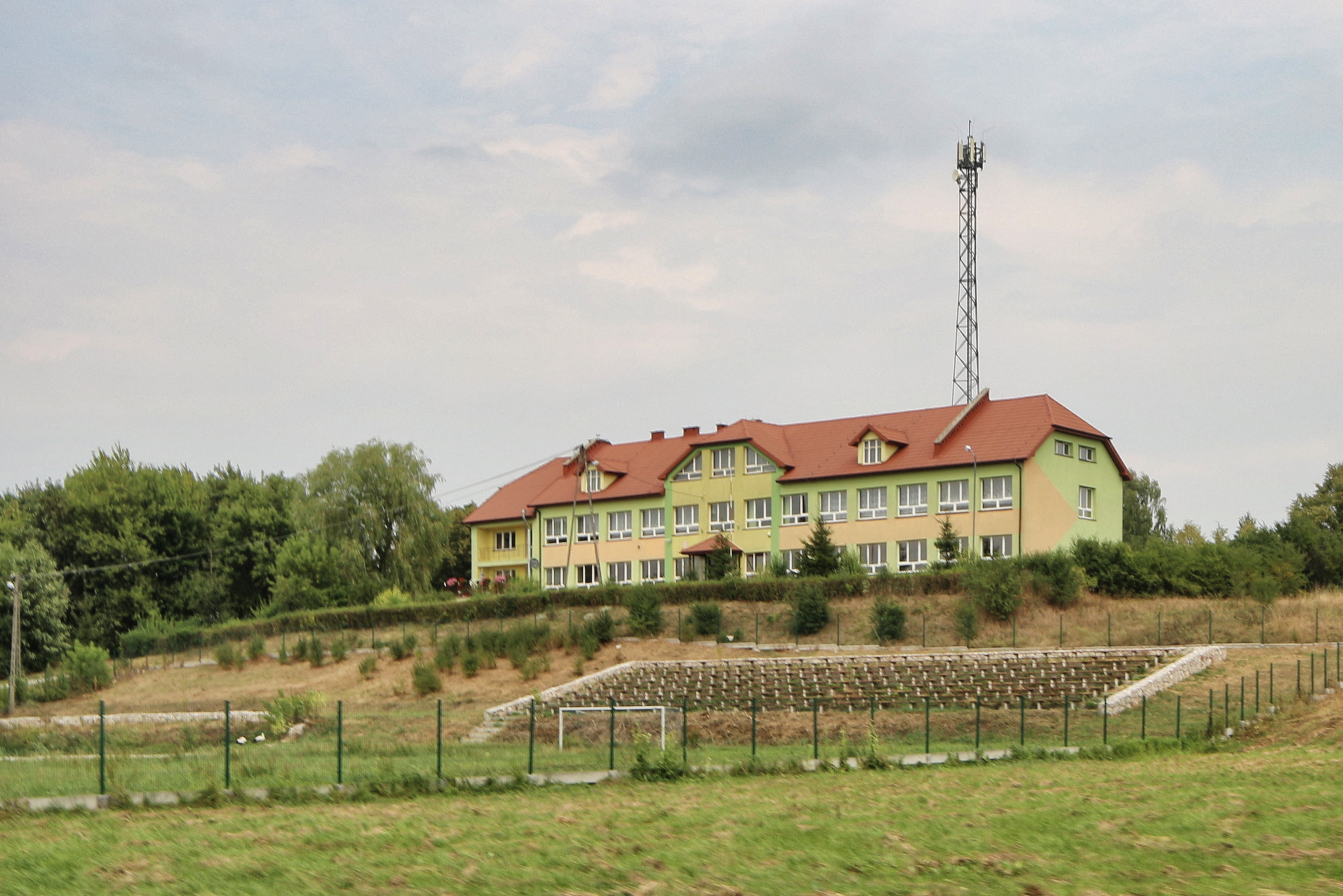
- School

- Location within Poland
- Coordinates: 50°43′30″N 20°32′18″E
- Country: Poland
- Voivodeship: Świętokrzyskie
- County: Kielce
- Gmina: Chęciny
- Population: 810

Łukowa [wuˈkɔva] is a village in the administrative district of Gmina Chęciny, within Kielce County, Świętokrzyskie Voivodeship, in south-central Poland. It lies approximately 10 km (6 mi) south-east of Chęciny and 19 km (12 mi) south of the regional capital Kielce.
