= Głogowa, Turek County =

Głogowa
- Village
- Location within Poland
- Coordinates: 52°6′N 18°26′E
- Country: Poland
- Voivodeship: Greater Poland
- County: Turek
- Gmina: Władysławów

Głogowa [ɡwɔˈɡɔva] is a village in the administrative district of Gmina Władysławów, within Turek County, Greater Poland Voivodeship, in west-central Poland.
