= Przymiarki, Świętokrzyskie Voivodeship =

Przymiarki
- Village
- Location within Poland
- Coordinates: 50°46′31″N 20°29′2″E
- Country: Poland
- Voivodeship: Świętokrzyskie
- County: Kielce
- Gmina: Chęciny
- Population: 220

Przymiarki [pʂɨˈmjarki] is a village in the administrative district of Gmina Chęciny, within Kielce County, Świętokrzyskie Voivodeship, in south-central Poland. It lies approximately 4 km (2 mi) south of Chęciny and 16 km (10 mi) south-west of the regional capital Kielce.
