= Felicjanów, Turek County =

Felicjanów
- Village
- Location within Poland
- Coordinates: 52°5′57″N 18°27′44″E
- Country: Poland
- Voivodeship: Greater Poland
- County: Turek
- Gmina: Władysławów
- Population: 218

Felicjanów [fɛlit͡sˈjanuf] is a village in the administrative district of Gmina Władysławów, within Turek County, Greater Poland Voivodeship, in west-central Poland.
