= Stefania, Greater Poland Voivodeship =

Stefania
- Village
- Location within Poland
- Coordinates: 52°8′N 18°28′E
- Country: Poland
- Voivodeship: Greater Poland
- County: Turek
- Gmina: Władysławów

Stefania [stɛˈfaɲa] is a village in the administrative district of Gmina Władysławów, within Turek County, Greater Poland Voivodeship, in west-central Poland.
