= Wyszyna, Greater Poland Voivodeship =

Wyszyna
- Village
- Location within Poland
- Coordinates: 52°4′N 18°24′E
- Country: Poland
- Voivodeship: Greater Poland
- County: Turek
- Gmina: Władysławów
- Population: 843

Wyszyna [vɨˈʂɨna] is a village in the administrative district of Gmina Władysławów, within Turek County, Greater Poland Voivodeship, in west-central Poland.
