= Beznazwa =

- Village
- Location within Poland
- Coordinates: 52°9′5″N 18°24′38″E
- Country: Poland
- Voivodeship: Greater Poland
- County: Turek
- Gmina: Władysławów
- Population: 261

Beznazwa [bɛzˈnazva] is a village in the administrative district of Gmina Władysławów, within Turek County, Greater Poland Voivodeship, in west-central Poland.
