= Skarbki =

- Village
- Location within Poland
- Coordinates: 52°8′8″N 18°30′29″E
- Country: Poland
- Voivodeship: Greater Poland
- County: Turek
- Gmina: Władysławów
- Population: 226

Skarbki [ˈskarpki] is a village in the administrative district of Gmina Władysławów, within Turek County, Greater Poland Voivodeship, in west-central Poland.
