= Przyborów, Greater Poland Voivodeship =

Przyborów
- Village
- Location within Poland
- Coordinates: 52°07′36″N 18°21′50″E
- Country: Poland
- Voivodeship: Greater Poland
- County: Turek
- Gmina: Władysławów
- Population: 72

Przyborów [pʂɨˈbɔruf] is a village in the administrative district of Gmina Władysławów, within Turek County, Greater Poland Voivodeship, in west-central Poland.
