= Józefów, Gmina Władysławów =

Józefów
- Village
- Location within Poland
- Coordinates: 52°8′42″N 18°26′4″E
- Country: Poland
- Voivodeship: Greater Poland
- County: Turek
- Gmina: Władysławów

Józefów (Polish pronunciation: [juˈzɛfuf]) is a village in the administrative district of Gmina Władysławów, within Turek County, Greater Poland Voivodeship, in west-central Poland.
