= Miedzianka, Świętokrzyskie Voivodeship =

Miedzianka
- Village
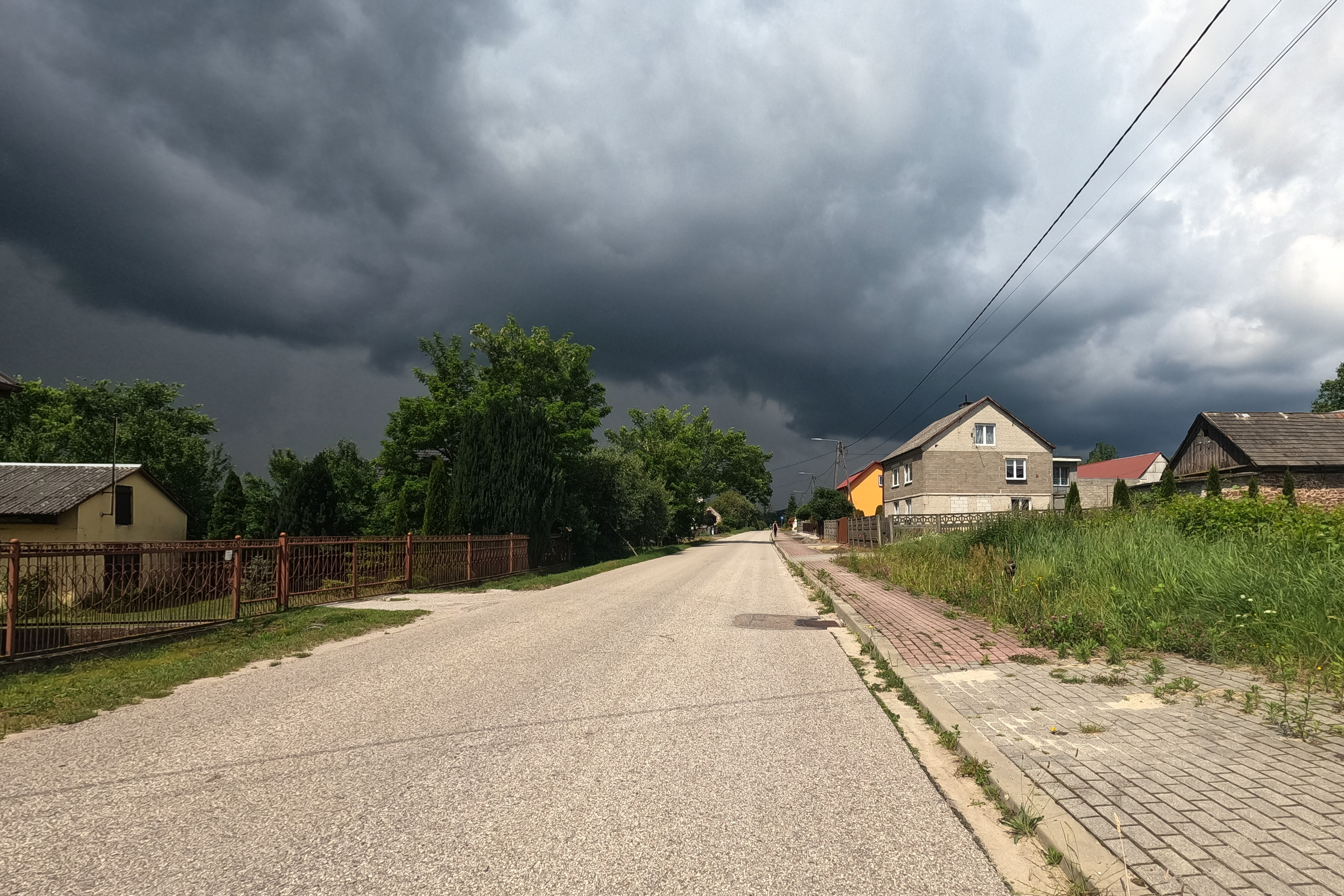

- Location within Poland
- Coordinates: 50°50′29″N 20°21′53″E
- Country: Poland
- Voivodeship: Świętokrzyskie
- County: Kielce
- Gmina: Chęciny
- Population: 330

Miedzianka [mjɛˈd͡ʑaŋka] is a village in the administrative district of Gmina Chęciny, within Kielce County, Świętokrzyskie Voivodeship, in south-central Poland. It lies approximately 9 km (6 mi) north-west of Chęciny and 19 km (12 mi) west of the regional capital Kielce.
