= Międzylesie, Turek County =

Międzylesie
- Village
- Location within Poland
- Coordinates: 52°5′N 18°29′E
- Country: Poland
- Voivodeship: Greater Poland
- County: Turek
- Gmina: Władysławów

Międzylesie [mjɛnd͡zɨˈlɛɕɛ] is a village in the administrative district of Gmina Władysławów, within Turek County, Greater Poland Voivodeship, in west-central Poland.
