= Jabłonna, Turek County =

Jabłonna
- Village
- Location within Poland
- Coordinates: 52°7′N 18°23′E
- Country: Poland
- Voivodeship: Greater Poland
- County: Turek
- Gmina: Władysławów

Jabłonna [jaˈbwɔnna] is a village in the administrative district of Gmina Władysławów, within Turek County, Greater Poland Voivodeship, in west-central Poland.
