= Mariantów, Turek County =

Mariantów
- Village
- Location within Poland
- Coordinates: 52°05′06″N 18°29′00″E
- Country: Poland
- Voivodeship: Greater Poland
- County: Turek
- Gmina: Władysławów

Mariantów [maˈrjantuf] is a village in the administrative district of Gmina Władysławów, within Turek County, Greater Poland Voivodeship, in west-central Poland.
