= Natalia =

Natalia (inter alia, transliteration of Ukrainian: Наталя) may refer to:

== People ==
- Natalia (given name), list of people with this name
- Natalia (Belgian singer) (born 1980)
- Natalia (Greek singer) (born 1983)
- Natalia (Indonesian singer) (born 1996)
- Natalia (Spanish singer) (born 1982)

== Music and film ==
- Natalia (film), a 1988 French film
- "Natalia", a song by Van Morrison from his 1978 album Wavelength
- "Natalia", a Venezuelan Waltz by Antonio Lauro

== Places ==
- Natalia Republic, a former republic in South Africa
- Natalia, Greater Poland Voivodeship (west-central Poland)
- Natalia, Masovian Voivodeship (east-central Poland)
- Natalia, Texas, a city in Medina County, Texas, United States

== Ships ==
- USS Natalia (SP-1251), a United States Navy patrol boat in commission from 1917 to 1918
