= Stawki, Gmina Władysławów =

Stawki
- Village
- Location within Poland
- Coordinates: 52°08′05″N 18°22′43″E
- Country: Poland
- Voivodeship: Greater Poland
- County: Turek
- Gmina: Władysławów
- Population: 106

Stawki [ˈstafki] is a village in the administrative district of Gmina Władysławów, within Turek County, Greater Poland Voivodeship, in west-central Poland.
