= Kuny, Greater Poland Voivodeship =

Kuny
- Village
- Location within Poland
- Coordinates: 52°9′N 18°26′E
- Country: Poland
- Voivodeship: Greater Poland
- County: Turek
- Gmina: Władysławów
- Population (approx.): 1,000

Kuny [ˈkunɨ] is a village in the administrative district of Gmina Władysławów, within Turek County, Greater Poland Voivodeship, in west-central Poland.

The village has an approximate population of 1,000.
