= Natalia, Greater Poland Voivodeship =

Natalia
- Village
- Location within Poland
- Coordinates: 52°9′N 18°29′E
- Country: Poland
- Voivodeship: Greater Poland
- County: Turek
- Gmina: Władysławów
- Population: 239

Natalia [naˈtalja] is a village in the administrative district of Gmina Władysławów, within Turek County, Greater Poland Voivodeship, in west-central Poland.
