= Russocice =

- Village
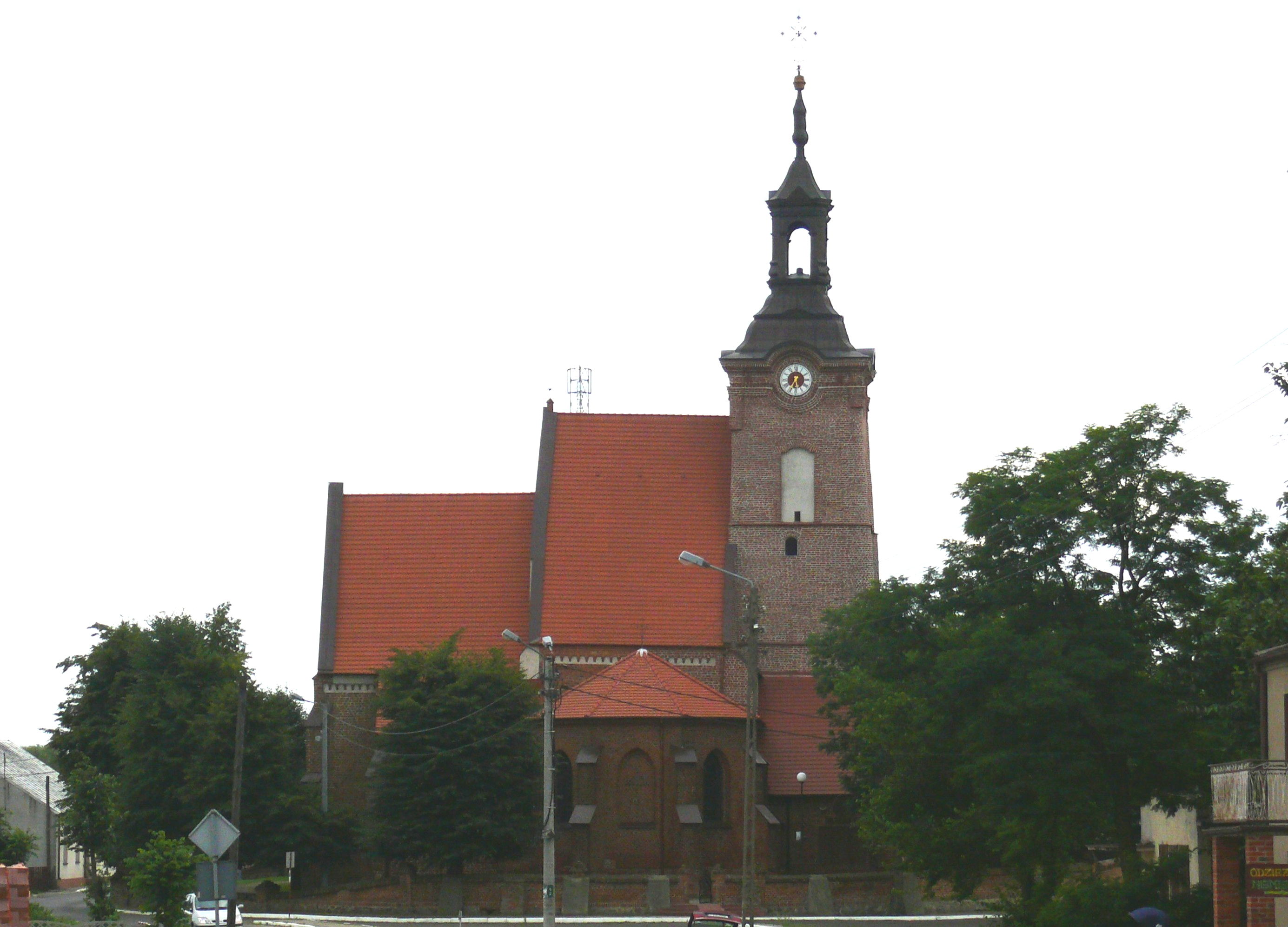
- Church of Saint Michael

- Location within Poland
- Coordinates: 52°6′N 18°28′E
- Country: Poland
- Voivodeship: Greater Poland
- County: Turek
- Gmina: Władysławów

Population
  - Total: 638

Russocice [russɔˈt͡ɕit͡sɛ] is a village in the administrative district of Gmina Władysławów, within Turek County, Greater Poland Voivodeship, in west-central Poland.
