= Gmina Chęciny =

Gmina Chęciny Chęciny Commune
- Gmina
- Flag Coat of arms
- Interactive map of Gmina Chęciny
- Coordinates (Chęciny): 50°48′10″N 20°28′2″E
- Country: Poland
- Voivodeship: Świętokrzyskie
- County: Kielce County
- Seat: Chęciny

Area
  - Total: 127.57 km^{2} (49.26 sq mi)

Population (2006)
  - Total: 14,715
  - Density: 115.35/km^{2} (298.75/sq mi)
  - Urban: 4,252
  - Rural: 10,463
- Website: http://www.checiny.pl/

Gmina Chęciny is an urban-rural gmina (administrative district) in Kielce County, Świętokrzyskie Voivodeship, in south-central Poland. Its seat is the town of Chęciny, which lies approximately 14 kilometres (9 mi) south-west of the regional capital Kielce.

The gmina covers an area of 127.57 square kilometres (49.3 sq mi), and as of 2006 its total population is 14,715 (out of which the population of Chęciny amounts to 4,252, and the population of the rural part of the gmina is 10,463).

The gmina contains part of the protected area called Chęciny-Kielce Landscape Park.

== Villages ==
Apart from the town of Chęciny, Gmina Chęciny contains the villages and settlements of Bolmin, Gościniec, Jedlnica, Korzecko, Lelusin, Lipowica, Łukowa, Miedzianka, Mosty, Ostrów, Podpolichno, Podzamcze Chęcińskie, Polichno, Przymiarki, Radkowice, Siedlce, Skiby, Starochęciny, Tokarnia, Wojkowiec and Wolica.

== Neighbouring gminas ==
Gmina Chęciny is bordered by the gminas of Małogoszcz, Morawica, Piekoszów, Sitkówka-Nowiny and Sobków.
