= Polichno, Greater Poland Voivodeship =

Polichno
- Village
- Location within Poland
- Coordinates: 52°6′N 18°30′E
- Country: Poland
- Voivodeship: Greater Poland
- County: Turek
- Gmina: Władysławów

Polichno (Polish pronunciation: [pɔˈlixnɔ]) is a village in the administrative district of Gmina Władysławów, within Turek County, Greater Poland Voivodeship, in west-central Poland.
