= Tarnowski Młyn, Turek County =

Tarnowski Młyn
- Village
- Location within Poland
- Coordinates: 52°6′15″N 18°24′57″E
- Country: Poland
- Voivodeship: Greater Poland
- County: Turek
- Gmina: Władysławów
- Population: 330

Tarnowski Młyn [tarˈnɔfski ˈmwɨn] is a village in the administrative district of Gmina Władysławów, within Turek County, Greater Poland Voivodeship, in west-central Poland.

The village is most famous for hosting a yearly Baked-Potato Festival which is a celebration of local agriculture and cottage food industry. Its highlights include a potato-peeling competition where locals compete to see who can peel potato’s the fastest as well as who can peel the most potatoes in a certain time frame.
