= Chęciny =

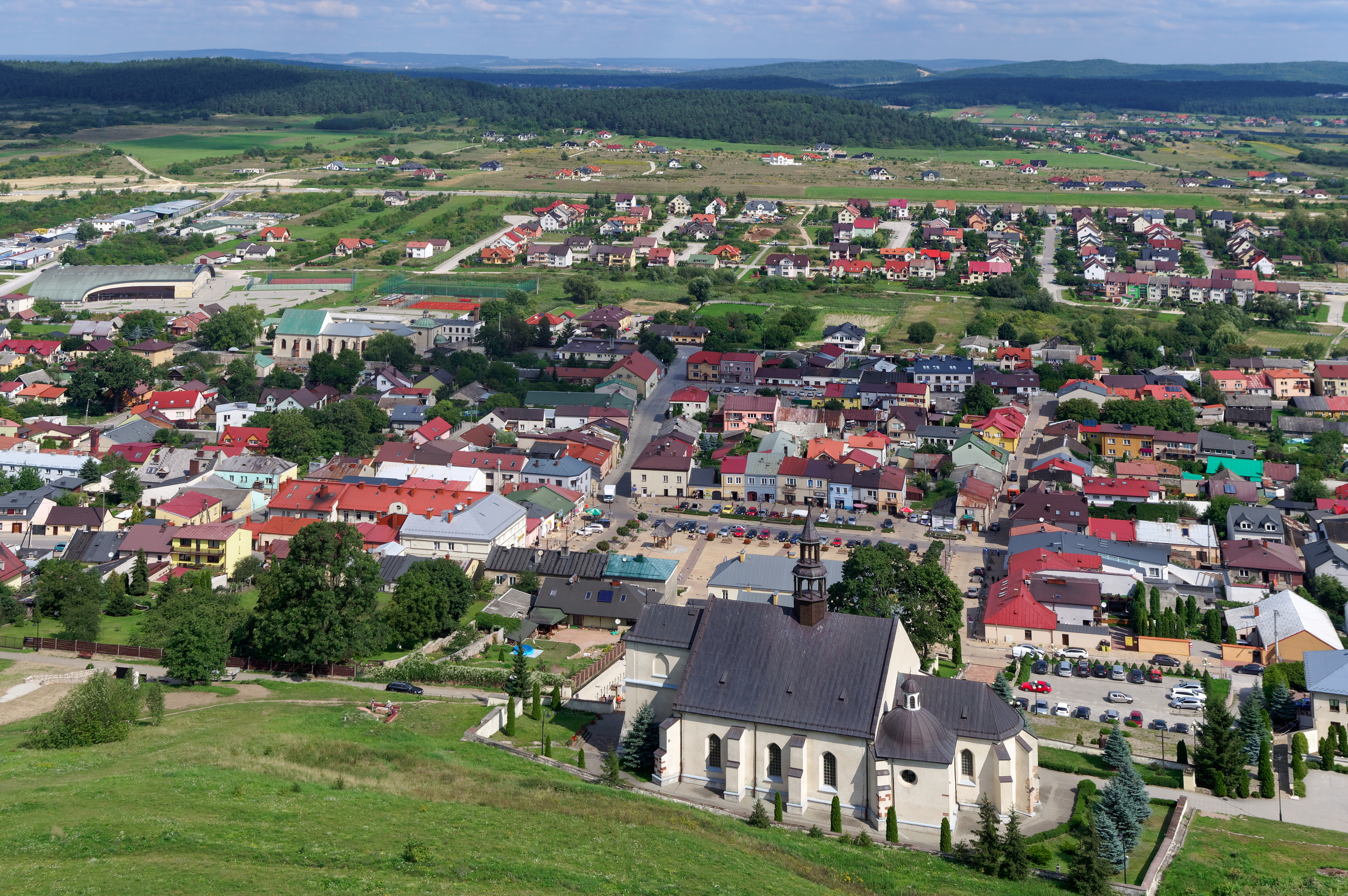
- View of the town from the Chęciny Castle

- Flag Coat of arms

- Location within Poland
- Coordinates: 50°48′10″N 20°28′2″E
- Country: Poland
- Voivodeship: Świętokrzyskie
- County: Kielce
- Gmina: Chęciny

Government
  - Mayor: Robert Jaworski (Ind.)

Area
  - Total: 14.12 km^{2} (5.45 sq mi)

Population (31 December 2021)
  - Total: 4,361
  - Density: 308.9/km^{2} (799.9/sq mi)
- Time zone: UTC+1 (CET)
  - Summer (DST): UTC+2 (CEST)
- Postal code: 26-060
- Area code: +48 41
- Vehicle registration: TKI
- Climate: Dfb
- Website: http://www.checiny.pl

Chęciny [xɛɲˈt͡ɕinɨ] is a town in Kielce County, Świętokrzyskie Voivodeship, southern Poland, with 4,361 inhabitants as of December 2021. It was first mentioned in historical documents from 1275, and obtained its city charter in 1325. At that time was one of major urban centers of northern Lesser Poland.

The most important sight in Chęciny is the royal castle built in the late 13th or early 14th century on the Castle Hill above the town. It fell into a ruin in the 18th century and remains in that state to this day. For centuries Chęciny had a Jewish community and it had been the center of the Hasidic Chentshin dynasty, (Chęciny being pronounced as "Chentshin" or "Khantchin" in Yiddish.)

== Location and name ==
Chęciny is located in Lesser Poland, and for centuries it belonged to Sandomierz Voivodeship. The distance to Kielce is 15 kilometres (9 miles). The town lies among the hills of western Świętokrzyskie Mountains, and is an important center of building materials, where the so-called Chęciny Marble is excavated. The town does not have a rail station, the nearest one is 5 km (3 mi) away in Radkowice. Chęciny is served by Kielce's mass transit system, and east of the town goes Expressway S7. With the ruins of the castle and Jaskinia Raj nearby, Chęciny is an important tourist center. There are several tourist trails, marked by different colors (red, blue and yellow).

== History ==
Historical population
Year	Pop.	±%
1860	4,428	—
1995	4,238	−4.3%
2000	4,325	+2.1%
2005	4,252	−1.7%
2010	4,486	+5.5%
2015	4,419	−1.5%
2020	4,394	−0.6%

The town is first mentioned in historical documents from 1275. It obtained its city charter in 1325. At that time Chęciny was an important urban center, where in May 1331 King Ladislaus I of Poland organized a meeting of Lesser Poland's and Greater Poland's nobility, to discuss the oncoming war with the Teutonic Knights. In 1465 Chęciny burned in a great fire, the same happened again in 1507. In the 16th century Chęciny was a local center of mining and commerce, with its marble famous across the Kingdom of Poland and the Polish–Lithuanian Commonwealth. It also was a center of Protestant Reformation. Chęciny was partially destroyed in the Zebrzydowski Rebellion, but real destruction came during the Swedish invasion in 1655 – 1660. On April 1, 1657 the town was completely destroyed by the Transilvanians of George II Rakoczi. In 1660 there were only 48 houses, out of 341 in 1655. In 1764 Chęciny was designated as legal center for northern Lesser Poland, for Radom, Chęciny and Opoczno counties. The 2nd Polish National Cavalry Brigade was stationed in Chęciny in the 1790s. In 1795 the town was annexed by Austria in the Third Partition of Poland, and next year, the seat of the county was moved to Kielce.

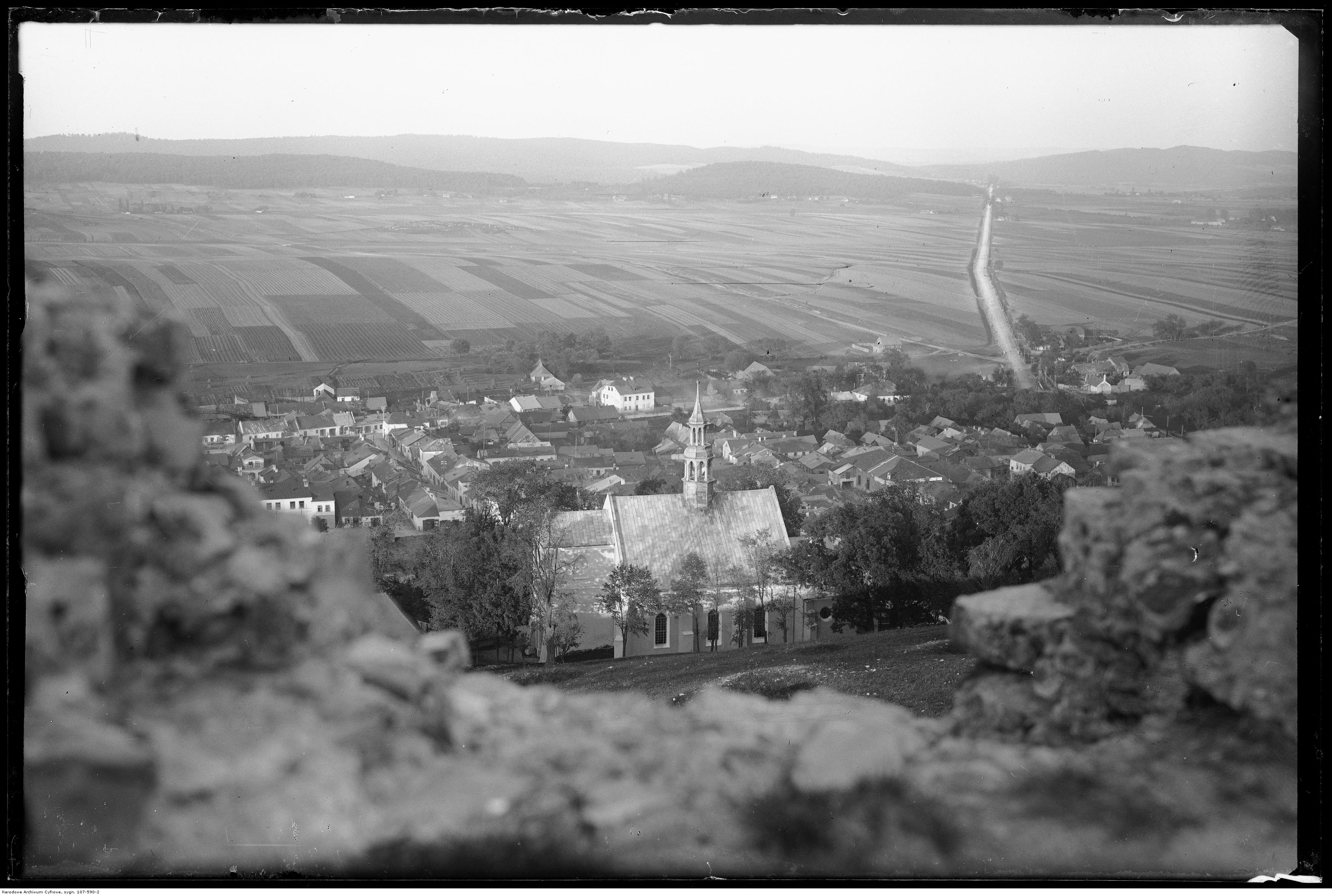
Chęciny in 1933

Most of this time, Jews were not permitted to live in Kielce, and had to find dwellings in nearby towns. By 1827 the (1740) Jews were 70% of the population. 70 years later they were 4,361, still 70%. A series of fires and recessions caused the Jewish population to dwindle to 61% in 1905, with 3,414 Jewish residents. By the end of World War I only 512 homes stood erect, and by 1921 there were only 2,825 Jewish residents, a mere 51%, living along the main road and around the town center. An account from the period depicts the town as being extremely unclean.

At the end of 1939, after the invasion of Poland, a Judenrat and the Jewish Ghetto Police was established by the Nazi German occupiers. In the spring of 1940 several dozen Jews from the new ghetto were murdered in a forest on the outskirts of town. In June 1940 there were approximately 2,800 local Jews and another 1,000 refugees remaining in the ghetto. In January 1941 the Germans planned to move 5,000 Jews from the Kielce Ghetto to Chęciny in exchange for 2,500 Polish forced-labourers, but due to a typhus epidemic in the town, this plan was postponed. On July 5, 1941 the order was given to establish the ghetto and by July 22 it was resettled during the Jewish "3 weeks of mourning". The ghetto had no walls, due to a shortage in materials. Some 500 Jews mostly from poor families, were chosen by the Judenrat, under German orders and sent to the HASAG labour camp in April 1942. In June another 105 Jews were rounded up to be sent to the HASAG camps, but vanished, and were probably shot.

919 Jews from Luposzno were brought to the town in September 1942, and small groups of Jews were brought in from other nearby cities, with the population rising 4000.

Under the orders of Gerulf Mayer, the local Gendarme commander, the ghetto was liquidated on September 12. The Jews were chased to the market square and marched to the Wolice train station 7 km (4 mi) away, where they were sent to the Treblinka death camp. Dozens were shot on the way during the assembly and march. 40 Jews "unfit for travel" remained in the ghetto and were shot on the 14th, two days later. A second group of 30 Jews from the Judenrat and other officials was left to search for valuables and bring them to the remaining synagogue. Some of these Jews escaped, the rest were killed in December by the Gendarmes.

== Points of interest ==
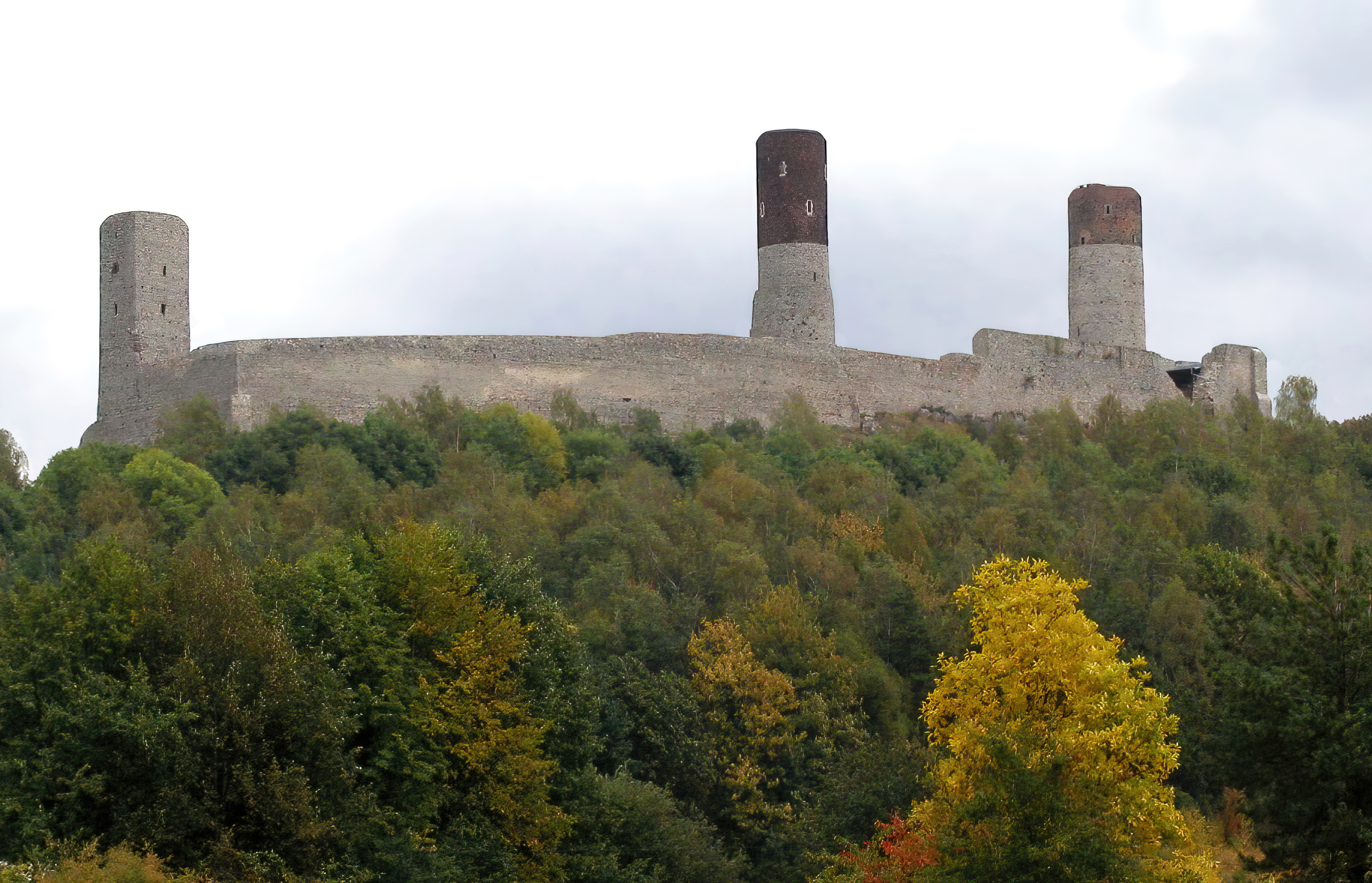
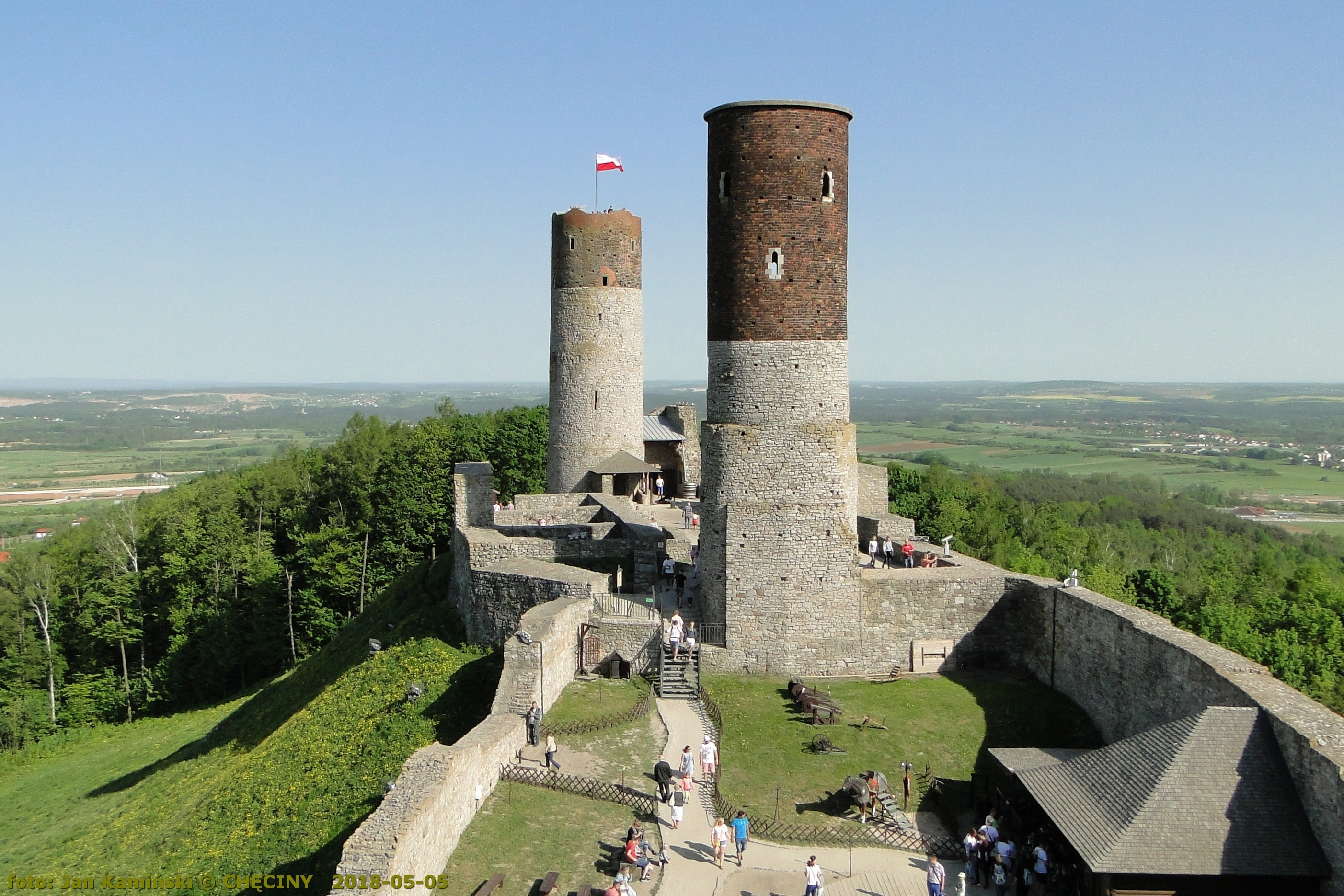
Chęciny Royal Castle
- Royal Castle – The construction of the fortress probably began around the 13th or 14th century. Around this date the upper part of the castle, consisting of the upper courtyard with housing unit and two rounded defensive towers, was built. The castle had its own chapel, located by the eastern tower. The castle treasure was being kept in the room above the chapel. It is certain that the castle existed in 1306, when King Ladislaus I presented it to the Archbishop of Kraków, Jan Muskata. In following years a dispute on ownership title of then Lesser Poland has been raised between the king and the bishop. As a result of the dispute, after detection of a plot against the royal power, the castle was returned to the king. King Ladislaus soon made the royal castle in Chęciny the centre of his political and military power. In 1318 the treasure of the Archdiocese of Gniezno was transferred and hidden inside the castle to prevent it from being captured by Teutonic Knights. The castle played a significant role as a place of concentration of Polish troops departing for Battle of Płowce with the Teutonic Knights in 1331. In the first half of the 14th century the stronghold was enlarged by King Casimir III the Great. Then the lower courtyard with a rectangle tower was constructed, forming the existing shape of the castle. At that time Chęciny became a residence of the king's second wife Adelaide of Hesse. It was also a residence of Elisabeth of Poland, Queen of Hungary, Sophia of Halshany and her son Władysław III of Varna and Italian by origin – Polish Queen Bona Sforza, who departed Poland in 1556. Later it was used for many years as a state prison with main dungeon located underneath the eastern tower. Among imprisoned here were: Michael Küchmeister von Sternberg future Grand Master of the Teutonic Knights, Andrzej Wingold, King Jogaila's half-brother. The castle briefly regained its former glory due to reconstruction initiated by Stanisław Branicki, Starost of Chęciny. However, in the second half of the 16th century, the castle began to decline. In 1588 the parliament ordered to transfer the castle's inventories to the Chęciny Parish Church. In 1607 the Castle was captured and burned by the Zebrzydowski Rebellion. In 1657 the Castle was again partially destroyed by the Rakoczy troops. During the Swedish Deluge the Castle turned into a ruin and remains in that state to this day. The ruins of the Castle have been preserved several times. First major construction works were undertaken in 1877. Between First and Second World Wars the castle was preserved by then mayor of the city Edmund Padechowicz. After the Second World War the castle was again preserved and partially reconstructed with middle tower rebuilt. Since then the eastern tower serves as a scenic viewpoint.
- The Parish Church of St Bartholomew is located at the rock terrace cut in the slope of the Zamkowa Mountain, 362 metres (1,188 feet) above sea level. It was probably founded by Ladislaus I. The construction was started around 1315 and was finished in the times of King Casimir the Great. In 1568–1603 it served The Polish Brethren – members of the Minor Reformed Church of Poland, a Nontrinitarian Protestant church that existed in Poland from 1565 to 1658. Brethren were popularly known as "Arians" or "Socinians" and after their expulsion from Poland, "Unitarians". The church gained its contemporary appearance during the last alteration in the years 1830–40. The Gothic character is preserved mainly in the stockade-like window shape, but the roofs were lowered and the tower was built. The triple-nave, hall church has an entrance leading through the vestibule from the 17th century with a tunnel vault. The side naves are based on octagonal pillars. The early Baroque altar was consecrated in 1628. The stalls surrounding the presbytery and those on the back side of the church come from the late Renaissance and were originally placed at the Franciscan monastery. A Renaissance Fodygas-Family chapel was built in 1614 by Swiss by origin – Kacper Fodyga (Gasparre Fidigga) right at the chancel. In the tomb the mummified bodies of miner and alderman of Chęciny – Kacper as well as his wife Zuzanna of Grodzianowice are buried.

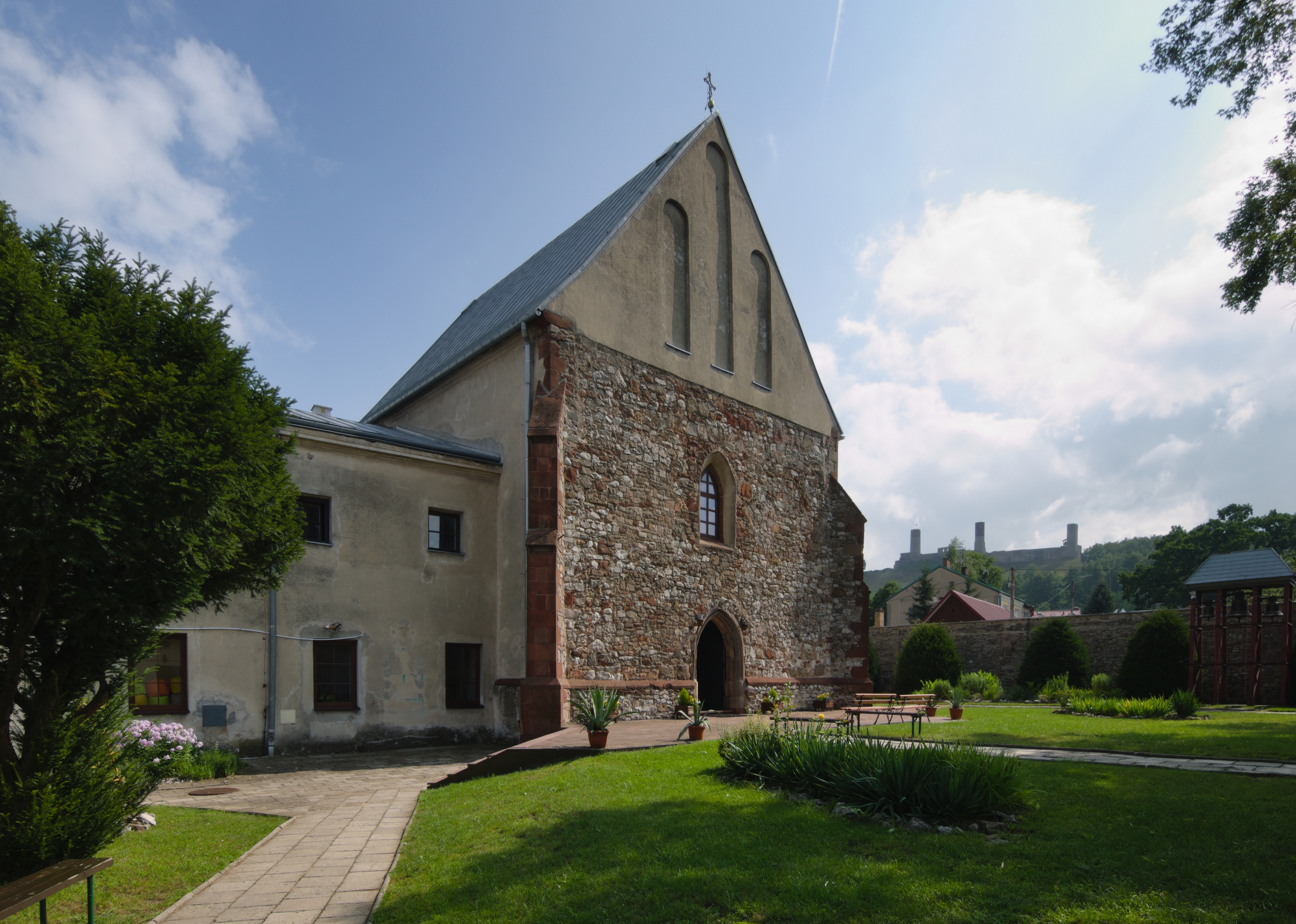
Assumption church

- Franciscan monastery complex is an interesting place. It was established In the second half of the 14th century. It was founded by King Casimir the Great in 1368. The church is built of stones in the gothic style. The whole courtyard is surrounded by buildings and stone-wall from the 17th century. In 1465 the church was burned with the majority of house estates. Between 1581–1603 the temple, captivated by Protestants, was seriously devastated. After the reconstruction undergone by the starost Stanisław Branicki the monastery was again destroyed by the troops of George II Rákóczi, who, plundered the monastery in search of treasure, murdered three monks, which is commemorated on the marble plaque inside. Another difficult time was the expulsion of the monks during the reign of Tsar Alexander I Then the monastery was turned into one of the strictest prisons in the świętokrzyskie mountains. Later, the building was used as public lavatory and tourist shelter. In the 1960s, the complex was restored and adapted for tourist purposes: the church housed the restaurant and the hotel. Despite continuing protests addressed to the then communist government party and state, this state lasted 19 years. In 1991, the monastery was turned back to the Franciscans.
- Niemczowka tenement house built in the Renaissance style, in the terrace building development, with the spacious transit entrance hall. It belonged to Walenty and Anna Niemiec Wrzesień. It was built in 1570. In the past it was an inn. On the ground floor in the big room there is a three-piece window with Renaissance columns, and also the ceiling joist, on which there is the date 1634 and the surname of the contemporary chęciński mayor Walenty Soboniewski. Originally the building was one-storey, at present it also has the mezzanine built into the roof and adapted to council flats. There are also cloister vaulted basements.
- Synagogue was built in 1638 due to the privilege of King Władysław IV Vasa, who granted Jews the right to build a double-chamber house of prayer. In 1657, after it was partially destroyed by the troops of Rákóczi the building was reconstructed and refurbished. In 1700 the entrance to the prayer chamber was lowered with a new door portal placed founded by noble and affluent members of the Jewish community. New interior paintings were added in the 19th century. In 1905 the building was again partially destroyed with a fire. In 1906 due to the funds of the Jewish community the synagogue was renovated with a new roof, staircase and interior paintings. During the II world war the interior was completely demolished by the Nazi soldiers. After the war it served as the public library and cinema. In 1958 the roof was reconstructed and synagogue was refurbished to house the local cultural centre. In 1991–1992 some works were also done mainly with respect to the floor, walls and main entrance door. The synagogue was built on a rectangular plan in the late Renaissance style. The building is covered with a Polish-style shake roof. The windows are framed with a late Renaissance stone frames. The corners of the building are reinforced with buttresses. The main chamber is lowered to the level of the street, and is covered with a barrel vault with lunettes. Preserved remains of stucco and polychrome decoration from the mid-19th century, and on the east wall the Mannerist Aron Kodesh (the Torah Ark) of the 17th century are to be found inside the main chamber. Aron Kodesh is made of black Dębnica marble inlaid with Chęciny marble in the form of a portal topped with cartouche and crown of the Torah. In addition, it is decorated with marble cannonballs placed on the stone imposts on a simple cornice.
- medieval shape of the center of the town, with a market square and 17th- and 19th-century houses.

== See also ==
- Nearby Jaskinia Raj (Paradise Cave)
