= Powiercie =

- Village
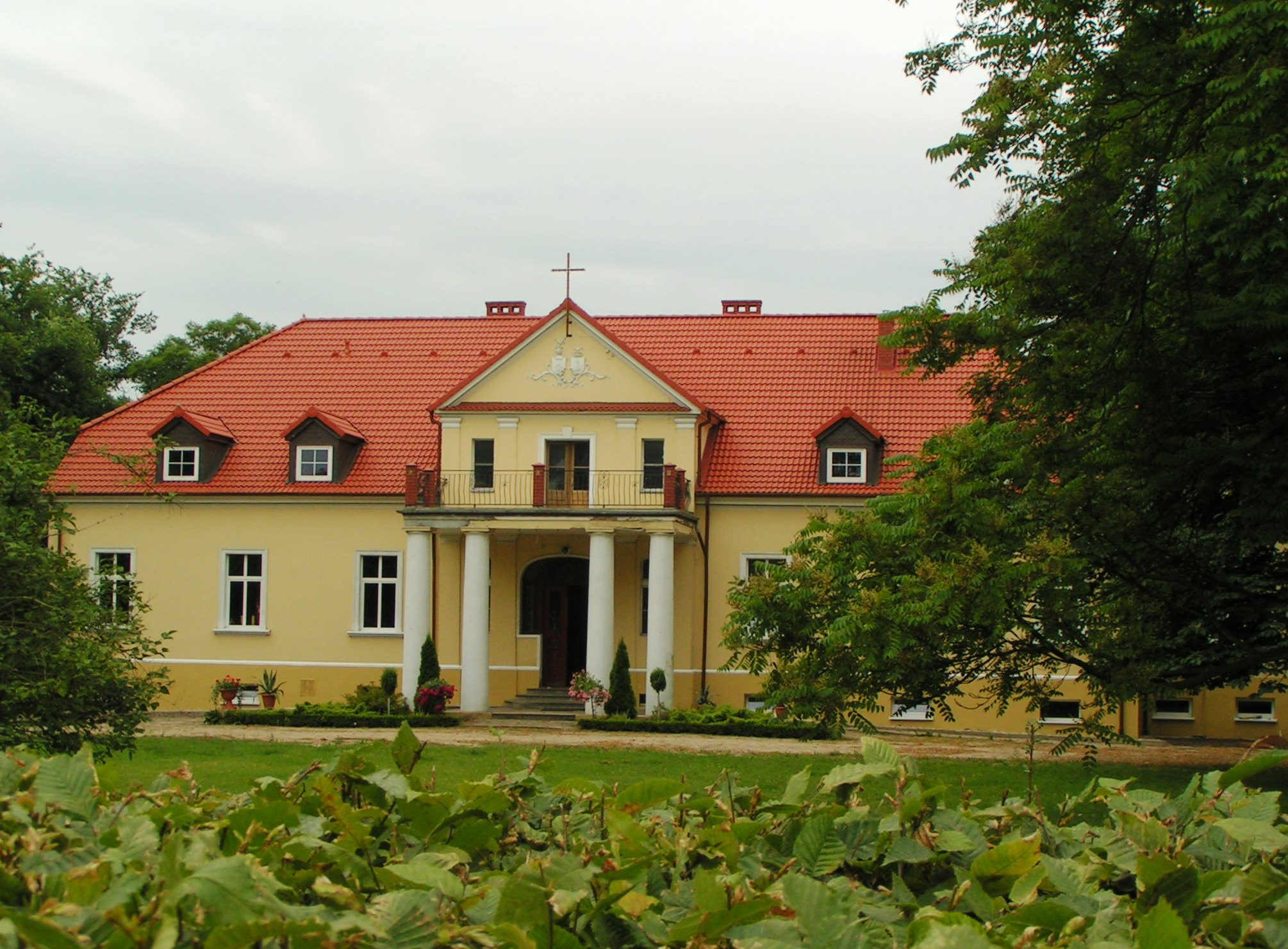
- Parish church in Powiercie manor

- Location within Poland
- Coordinates: 52°11′N 18°42′E
- Country: Poland
- Voivodeship: Greater Poland
- County: Koło
- Gmina: Koło
- Population: 710
- Time zone: UTC+1 (CET)
  - Summer (DST): UTC+2 (CEST)
- Vehicle registration: PKL

Powiercie [pɔˈvjɛrt͡ɕɛ] is a village in the administrative district of Gmina Koło, within Koło County, Greater Poland Voivodeship, in central Poland.

The village has an agricultural school, formerly a gardening school.

== History ==
=== World War II ===
Following the German-Soviet invasion of Poland, which started World War II in September 1939, the village was occupied by Germany until 1945. During the most deadly phase of the Holocaust in Poland on January 16, 1942, the SS and police began deportations from the Łódź Ghetto to the Chełmno extermination camp nearby. German officials transported the Jews from Łódź by train to Koło railway station, six miles (10 km) northwest of Chełmno. There, the SS and police personnel supervised transfer of the Jews from the freight as well as passenger trains, to smaller-size cargo trains running on a narrow-gauge track, which took them from Koło to the Powiercie station.

Beginning in late July 1942, the victims were brought to the camp directly after the regular railway line linking Koło with Dąbie was restored; the bridge over the Rgilewka River had been repaired. As round-ups in Łódź normally took place in the morning, it was usually late afternoon by the time the victims arrived by rail. Therefore, they were marched to a disused mill at Zawadka some two kilometres from Powiercie where they spent the night. The mill continued to be used after the railway repairs, if transports arrived late. The following morning the Jews were transported from Zawadka by truck, in numbers which could be easily controlled at their destination point. They were "processed" immediately upon arrival at the manor-house camp.
