= Chełmno extermination camp =

Nazi extermination camp in Poland (1941–1945)

Chełmno / Kulmhof
- Extermination camp
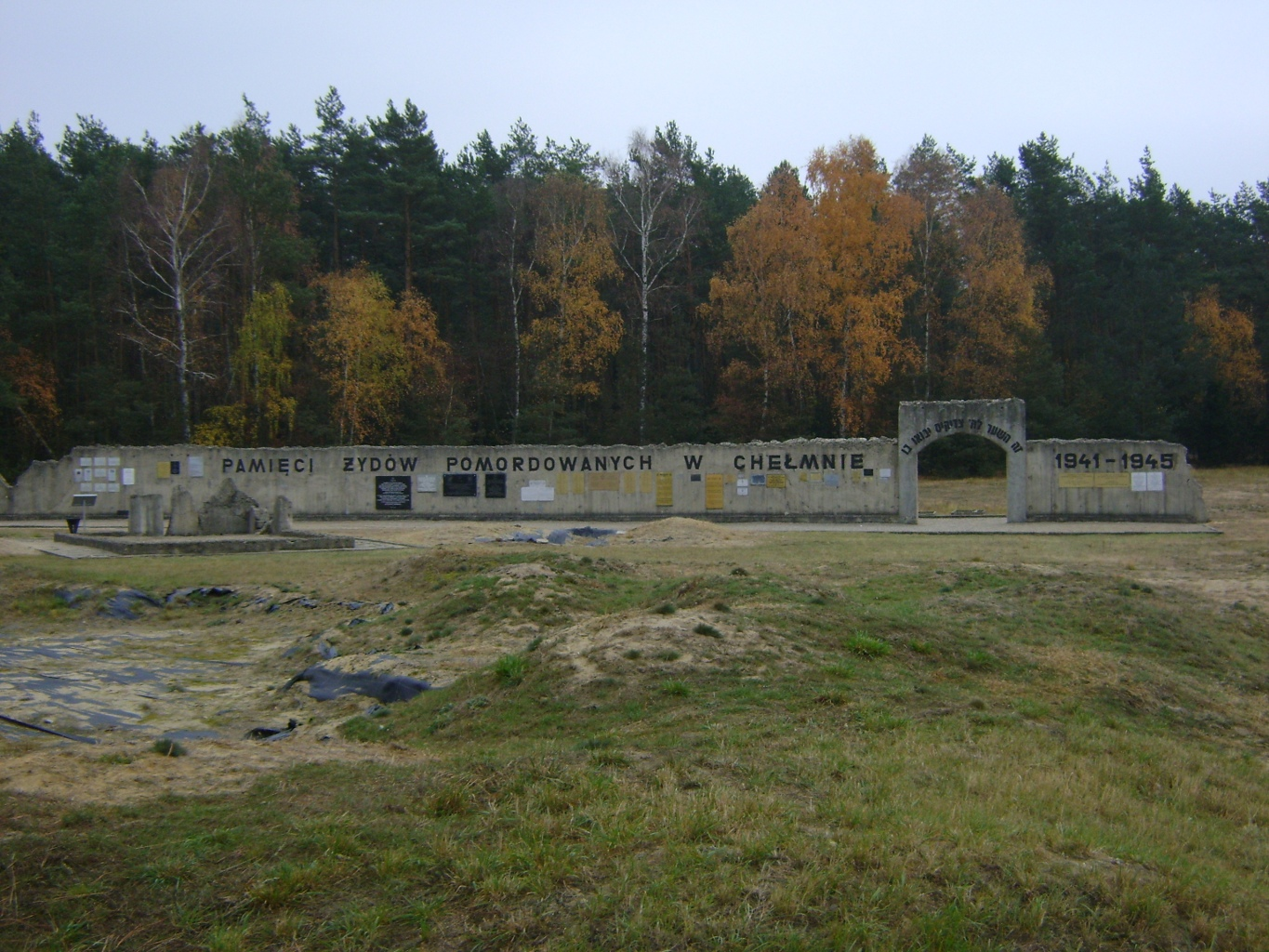

- Location of the former Chełmno extermination camp in Poland
- Coordinates: 52°09′15″N 18°43′23″E
- Location: Near Chełmno nad Nerem, Reichsgau Wartheland (German-occupied Poland)
- Commandant: Herbert Lange, Christian Wirth, Hans Bothmann
- Operational: December 8, 1941 – April 11, 1943 (1st period), June 23, 1944 – January 18, 1945
- Number of gas chambers: 3 gas vans
- Inmates: mostly Jews
- Killed: est. 152,000–200,000
- Liberated by: Red Army, January 20, 1945
- Notable inmates: Mordechaï Podchlebnik, Szymon Srebrnik, Szlama Ber Winer

Chełmno, (Note: [ˈxɛu̯mnɔ], approximately KHEHM-no) or Kulmhof, was the first of Nazi Germany's extermination camps and was situated 50 km (31 mi) north of Łódź, near the village of Chełmno nad Nerem. Following the invasion of Poland in 1939, Germany annexed the area into the new territory of Reichsgau Wartheland. The camp, which was specifically intended for no other purpose than mass murder, operated from December 8, 1941, to April 11, 1943, parallel to Operation Reinhard during the deadliest phase of the Holocaust, and again from June 23, 1944, to January 18, 1945, during the Soviet counter-offensive. In 1943, modifications were made to the camp's killing methods as the reception building had already been dismantled.

At the very minimum, 152,000 people were murdered in the camp, which would make it the fifth deadliest extermination camp, after Auschwitz, Treblinka, Bełżec, and Sobibór. However, the West German prosecution, citing Nazi figures during the Chełmno trials of 1962–65, laid charges for at least 180,000 victims. The Polish official estimates, in the early postwar period, have suggested much higher numbers, up to a total of 340,000 men, women, and children. The Kulmhof Museum of Martyrdom gives the figure of around 200,000, the vast majority of whom were Jews of west-central Poland, along with Romani people from the region, as well as foreign Jews from Hungary, Bohemia and Moravia, Germany, Luxembourg, and Austria transported to Chełmno via the Łódź Ghetto, on top of the Soviet prisoners of war. The victims were murdered using gas vans. Chełmno was a place of early experimentation in the development of the Nazi extermination programme.

Red Army troops captured the town of Chełmno on January 17, 1945. By then, the Germans had already destroyed evidence of the camp's existence, leaving no prisoners behind. One of the camp survivors, who was fifteen years old at the time, testified that only three Jewish males had escaped successfully. The Holocaust Encyclopedia counted seven Jews who escaped; among them was the author of the Grojanowski Report, written under an assumed name by Szlama Ber Winer, a prisoner in the Jewish Sonderkommando who escaped only to perish at Bełżec during the liquidation of yet another Jewish ghetto in German-occupied Poland. In June 1945, two survivors testified at the trial of camp personnel in Łódź. The three best-known survivors testified about Chełmno at the 1961 trial of Adolf Eichmann in Jerusalem. Two survivors testified also at the camp personnel trials conducted in 1962–65 by West Germany.

== Background ==
Chełmno nad Nerem is a village in Poland, annexed to Nazi Germany in 1939 and renamed Kulmhof during German occupation. As the Nazis themselves exclusively referred to the camp as "Kulmhof", the name "Chełmno extermination camp" is not historically accurate, with its use perhaps deriving from the Main Commission for Investigation of German Crimes in Poland shortly after the war.

Chełmno (Kulmhof) camp was set up by SS-Sturmbannführer Herbert Lange, following his gas van experiments in the murder of 1,558 Polish prisoners of the Soldau concentration camp northeast of Chełmno nad Nerem. In October 1941, Lange toured the area looking for a suitable site for an extermination centre, and chose Chełmno on the Ner, because of the estate, with a large manor house similar to Sonnenstein, which could be used for mass admissions of prisoners with only minor modifications. Staff for the facility was selected personally by Ernst Damzog, Commander of Security Police and SD from headquarters in occupied Poznań (Posen). Damzog formed the SS-Sonderkommando Lange (special detachment), and appointed Herbert Lange the first camp commandant because of his experience in the mass-murder of Poles from Wartheland (Wielkopolska). Lange served with Einsatzgruppe VI during Operation Tannenberg. Already by mid-1940, Lange and his men were responsible for the murder of about 1,100 patients in Owińska, 2,750 patients at Kościan, 1,558 patients and 300 Poles at Działdowo, and hundreds of Poles at Fort VII where the mobile gas-chamber (Einsatzwagen) was invented. Their earlier hospital victims were usually shot out of town in the back of the neck. The two so-called Kaisers-Kaffe vans, manufactured by the Gaubschat factory in Berlin, were delivered in November. Chełmno began mass gassing operations on December 8, 1941 using vehicles approved by Obergruppenführer Reinhard Heydrich from RSHA. Two months later, on January 20, 1942, Heydrich, who had already confirmed the effectiveness of industrial-scale murder by exhaust fumes, called a secret meeting of German officials to undertake the European-wide Final Solution to the Jewish Question under the pretext of "resettlement".

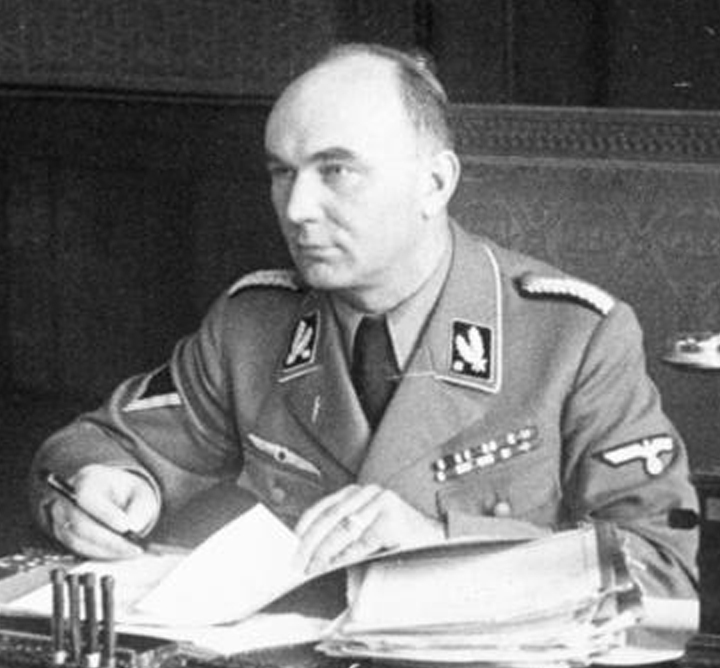
Gauleiter Arthur Greiser in Poznań (Posen), 1939

The use of the killing centre at Chełmno for the mass murder of rapidly growing number of Jews deported to the Łódź Ghetto ("Special Handling", the Sonderbehandlung) was initiated by Arthur Greiser, the Governor of Reichsgau Wartheland. In a letter to Himmler dated May 30, 1942, Greiser referred to an authorization he had received from him and Reinhard Heydrich, stating that the clandestine program of murdering 100,000 Polish Jews, about one-third of the total Jewish population of Wartheland, was expected to be carried out soon. Greiser's plan was based on the German government's decision of October 1941 to deport German Jews to the Łódź Ghetto. Greiser and the SS decided to create space for the incoming Jews by annihilating the existing Polish-Jewish population in his district.

According to post-war testimony of Wilhelm Koppe, Higher SS and Police Leader for Reichsgau Wartheland, Koppe received an order from Himmler to liaise with Greiser regarding the Sonderbehandlung requested by the latter. Koppe entrusted the extermination operation to SS-Standartenführer Ernst Damzog from Security Police in Poznań. Damzog supervised the camp's daily operations thereafter.

== Architecture ==
The killing center consisted of a vacated manorial estate in the village of Chełmno on the Ner river, and a large forest clearing about 4 km (2.5 mi) northwest of Chełmno, off the road to Koło town with a sizable Jewish population which had been previously ghettoized. The two sites were known respectively as the Schlosslager (manor-house camp) and the Waldlager (forest camp). On the grounds of the estate was a large two-story brick country house called "the palace". Its rooms were adapted to use as the reception offices, including space for the victims to undress and to give up their valuables. The SS and police staff and guards were housed in other buildings in the town. The Germans had a high wooden fence built around the manor house and the grounds. The clearing in the forest camp, which contained large mass graves, was likewise fenced off. The camp consisted of separate zones: an administration section with nearby barracks and storage for plundered goods; and the more distant burial and cremation site to which victims were delivered in hermetically proofed superstructures.

=== Operations ===
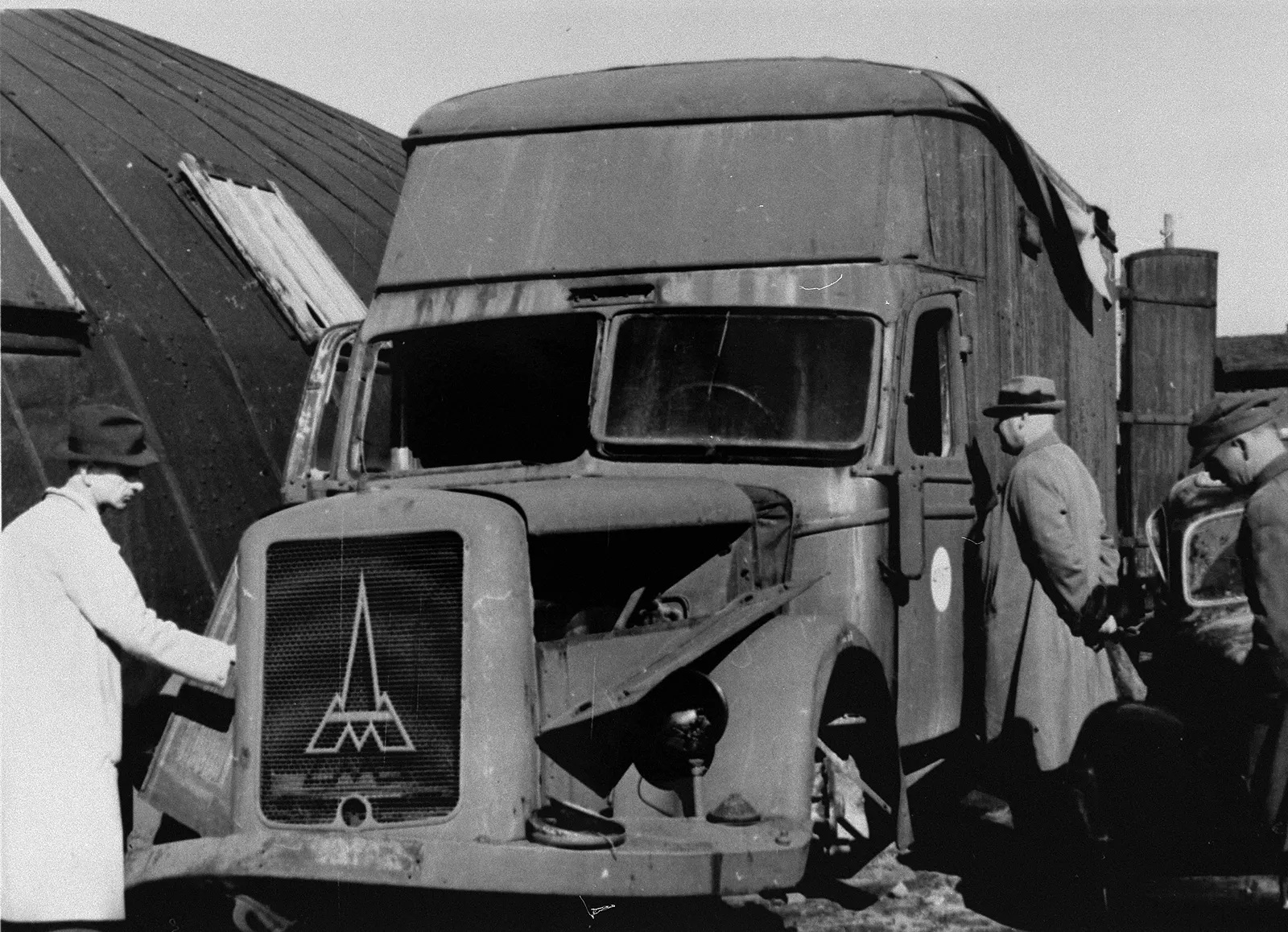
A model of Magirus-Deutz gas van used for murder at Chełmno; the exhaust fumes were diverted into the sealed rear compartment where the victims were locked in. This particular van had not been modified yet.

The SS-Sonderkommando "Lange" was supplied with two vans initially, each carrying about 50 Jews gassed en route to the forest. Later on, Lange was given three gas vans by the RSHA in Berlin for the murder of greater numbers of victims. The vehicles had been converted to mobile gas-chambers by the Gaubschat company (de) in Berlin which, by June 1942, produced twenty of them in accordance with the SS purchase order. The sealed compartments (also called superstructures) installed on the chassis had floor openings – about 60 mm (2.4 in) in diameter – with metal pipes welded below, into which the engine exhaust was directed. Victims generally suffocated to death, with their "bodies thrown out blue, wet with sweat and urine, the legs covered with excrement and menstrual blood". Drivers of gas vans also heard victims screaming and knocking on the walls.

The SS had first used pure carbon monoxide from steel cylinders to murder mental patients in extermination hospitals of Action T4, and therefore had considerable knowledge of its efficacy. For all practical purposes, the extermination by mobile gas vans proved equally efficient following Operation Barbarossa of 1941. In the newly occupied territories, the gas vans were used to murder mental patients as well as Jews in the extermination ghettos. By employing just three vans on the Eastern Front (the Opel-Blitz and the larger Saurerwagen), without any faults occurring in the vehicles, the Einsatzgruppen were able to murder 97,000 captives in less than six months between December 1941 and June 1942. The SS relayed urgent requests to Berlin for more vans.

The rank and file of the so-called SS Special Detachment Lange was made up of Gestapo, Criminal Police, and Order Police personnel, under the leadership of Security Police and SD officers. Herbert Lange was replaced as camp commandant in March (or April) 1942 by Schultze. He was succeeded by SS-Captain Hans Bothmann, who formed and led the Special Detachment Bothmann. The maximum strength of each Special Detachment was just under 100 men, of whom around 80 belonged to the Order Police. The local SS also maintained a "paper command" of the camps Allgemeine-SS inspectorate, to which most of the Chełmno camp staff were attached for administrative purposes. Historians do not believe members of the 120th SS-Standarte office established in Chełmno performed any duties at the camp.

== Deportations begin ==
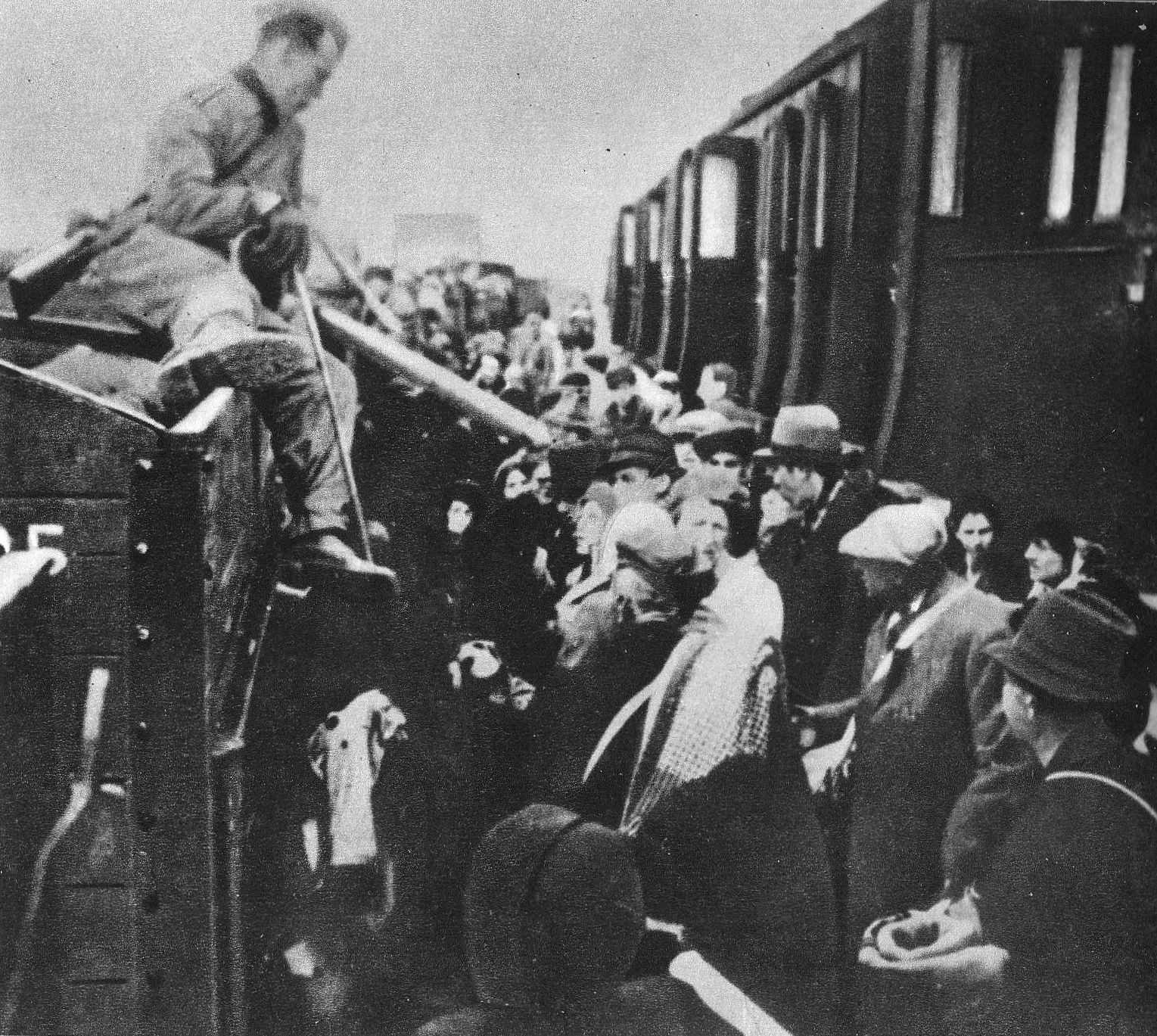
Deportation to Chełmno

The SS and police began murdering victims at Chełmno on December 8, 1941. The first people transported to the camp were the Jewish and Romani populations of Koło, Dąbie, Sompolno, Kłodawa, Babiak, Izbica Kujawska, Bugaj, Nowiny Brdowskie and Kowale Pańskie. A total of 3,830 Jews and around 4,000 Romani were murdered by gas before February 1942. The victims were brought from all over Koło County (German: Landkreis Warthbrücken) to Koło by rail with the last stop in Powiercie. Using whips, the Orpo police marched them toward the Warta river near Zawadka, where they were locked overnight in a mill, without food or water. The next morning, they were loaded onto lorries and taken to Chełmno. At "the palace", they were stripped of possessions, transferred to vans, and murdered with exhaust fumes on the way to burial pits in the forest. The daily average for the camp was about six to nine van-loads of the dead. The drivers used gas-masks. From January 1942, the transports included hundreds of Poles and Soviet prisoners of war. In addition, they included over 10,000 Jews from Germany, Austria, Bohemia, Moravia and Luxembourg, who had first been deported to the Łódź Ghetto and subsisted there already for weeks.

As soon as the ramp had been erected in the castle, people started arriving in Kulmhof from Litzmannstadt (Łódź) in lorries... The people were told that they had to take a bath, that their clothes had to be disinfected and that they could hand in any valuable items beforehand to be registered. When they had undressed they were sent to the cellar of the castle and then along a passageway onto the ramp and from there into the gas-van. In the castle, there were signs marked "to the baths". The gas vans were large vans, about 4–5 m [13–16 ft] long, 2.2 m [7.2 ft] wide and 2 m [6.6 ft] high. The interior walls were lined with sheet metal. A wooden grille was set into the floor. The floor of the van had an opening which could be connected to the exhaust by means of a removable metal pipe. When the lorries were full of people, the double doors at the back were closed and the exhaust connected to the interior of the van. — SS-Scharführer Walter Burmeister, The Good Old Days

In late February 1942, the secretary of the local Polish council in Chełmno, Stanisław Kaszyński (b. 1903), was arrested for trying to bring public attention to what was being perpetrated at the camp. He was interrogated and executed three days later on February 28, 1942, near a church along with his wife. His secret communiqué was intercepted by the SS-Sonderkommando. Today, there is an obelisk to his memory erected at Chełmno on August 7, 1991. Over 4,500, Czech Jews from Prague were sent to the Łódź Ghetto before May 1942. One of the sisters of author Franz Kafka, Valli Kafka (born 1890), was murdered with them before mid-September.

=== Killing process ===
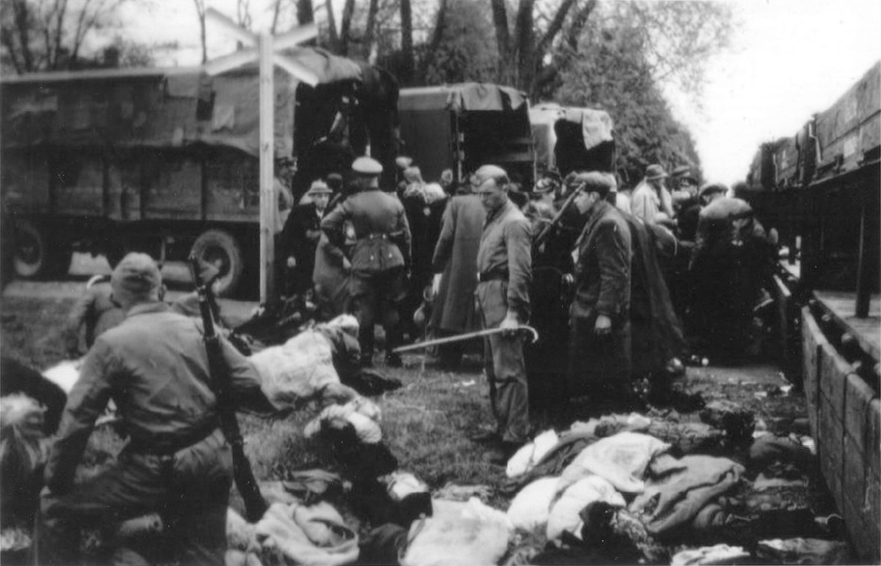
Jews were delivered by train to Koło, then to nearby Powiercie, and in overcrowded lorries to the camp. They were forced to abandon their bundles along the way. In this photo, loading of victims sent from the Łódź Ghetto.

During the first five weeks, the murder victims came only from the nearby areas. On reaching their final destination before "transport" to Germany and Austria, the Jews disembarked in the courtyard of the Schlosslager manor where the SS men wearing white coats and pretending to be medics waited for them with a translator released earlier from the Gestapo prison in Poznań. The victims were led to a large empty room and ordered to undress; their clothing stacked for disinfection. They were told that all hidden banknotes would be destroyed during steaming and needed to be taken out and handed over for safe-keeping. Occasionally they were met by a German officer dressed as a local squire with a Tyrolean hat, announcing that some of them would remain there.

Wearing just underwear, with the women allowed to keep slips on, the victims were taken to the cellar and across the ramp into the back of a gas van holding from 50–70 people each (Opel Blitz) and up to 150 (Magirus). When the van was full, the doors were shut and the engine started. Surviving witnesses heard their screams as they were dying of asphyxiation. After about 5–10 minutes, the vans full of corpses were driven 4 km (2.5 mi) to the forest Waldlager camp. The vans were unloaded to excavated mass graves, and cleaned by the Waldkommando before returning to the manor house. Scharführer Walter Burmeister, a gas-van driver, made sure his own vehicle "would be cleaned of the excretions of the people that had died in it. Afterwards, it would once again be used for gassing" at the loading dock.

=== Murder of Jews from the Łódź Ghetto ===
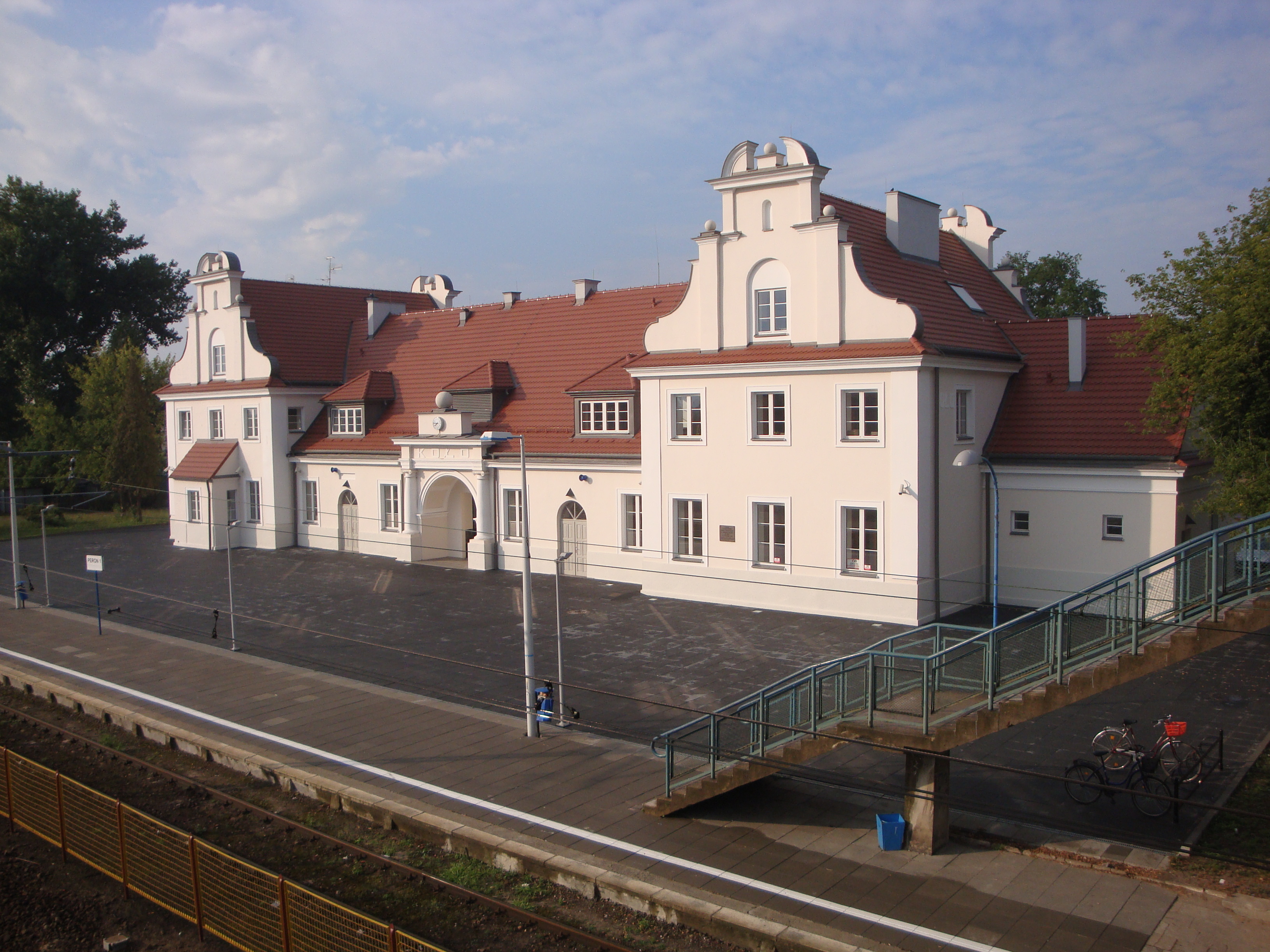
Koło railway station

On January 16, 1942, the SS and police began deportations from the Łódź Ghetto lasting for two weeks. German officials with the aid of Ordnungspolizei rounded up 10,000 Polish Jews based on selection by the ghetto Judenrat. The victims were transported from the Radegast train station in Łódź, to Koło railway station, 10 km (6.2 mi) northwest of Chełmno. There, the SS and police personnel supervised transfer of prisoners from the freight as well as passenger trains, to smaller-size cargo trains running on narrow gauge tracks, which took them from Koło to a much smaller Powiercie station, just outside Chełmno.

As round-ups in Łódź normally took place in the morning, it was usually late afternoon by the time Jews disembarked from the Holocaust trains in Powiercie. Therefore, they were marched to a disused mill at Zawadki some two kilometres distance where they spent the night. The mill building continued to be used after the railway repairs, if transports arrived late. The following morning the Jews were transported from Zawadki by truck, in numbers which could be easily controlled at their destination. The victims were "processed" immediately upon arrival at the manor-house. Beginning in late July 1942, the victims were brought to the camp directly from Powiercie after the regular railway line linking Koło with Dąbie was restored; and the bridge over the Rgilewka River had been repaired.

== Sonderkommando ==
The German SS staff selected young Jewish prisoners from incoming transports to join the camp Sonderkommando, a special unit of 50 to 60 men deployed at the forest burial camp. They removed corpses from the gas-vans and placed them in mass graves. The large trenches were quickly filled, but the smell of decomposing bodies began to permeate the surrounding countryside including nearby villages. In the spring of 1942, the SS ordered burning of the bodies in the forest. The bodies were cremated on open air grids constructed of concrete slabs and rail tracks; pipes were used for air ducts, and long ash pans were built below the grid. Later, the Jewish Sonderkommando had to exhume the mass graves and burn the previously interred bodies. In addition, they sorted the clothing of the victims, and cleaned the excrement and blood from the vans.

A small detachment of about 15 Jews worked at the manor house, sorting and packing the belongings of the victims. Between eight and ten skilled craftsmen worked there to produce or repair goods for the SS Special Detachment.

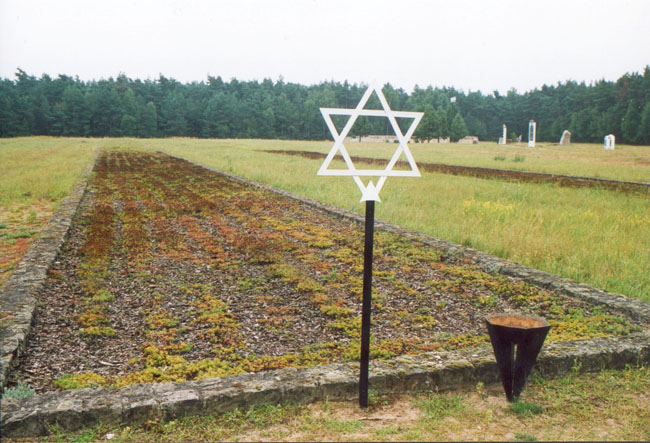
Mass grave at the forest Waldlager of the Chełmno extermination camp

Periodically, the SS executed the members of the Jewish special detachment and replaced them with workers selected from recent transports. The SS held jumping contests and races among the prisoners, who were shackled with chains on their ankles, to deem who was fit to continue working. The losers of such contests were shot.

== Stages of camp operation ==
The early killing process carried out by the SS from December 8, 1941, until mid-January 1942, was intended to murder Jews from all nearby towns and villages, which were slated for German colonization (Lebensraum). From mid-January 1942, the SS and Order Police began transporting Jews in crowded freight and passenger trains from Łódź. By then, Jews had also been deported to Łódź from Germany, Bohemia-Moravia, and Luxembourg, and were included in the transports at that time. The transports included most of the 5,000 Roma (Gypsies) who had been deported from Austria. Throughout 1942, the Jews from Wartheland were still being processed; in March 1943 the SS declared the district judenfrei. Other victims murdered at the killing center included several hundred Poles, and Soviet prisoners of war.

During the summer of 1942, the new commandant Bothmann made substantial changes to the camp's murder techniques. The change was prompted by two incidents in March and April of that year. First, the gas-van broke down on the highway while full of living victims. Many passers-by heard their loud cries. Soon after that, the Saurer van exploded while the driver was revving its engine at the loading ramp; the gassing compartment was full of living Jews. The explosion blew off the locked back door, and badly burned the victims inside. Drivers were replaced. Bothmann's modifications included adding poison to gasoline. There is evidence that some red powder and a fluid were delivered from Germany by Maks Sado freight company, in order to murder the victims more quickly. Another major change involved parking the gas vans while prisoners were murdered. They were no longer driven en route to the forest cremation area with living victims inside.

After having annihilated almost all Jews of Wartheland District, in March 1943 the Germans closed the Chełmno killing centre, while Operation Reinhard was still underway elsewhere. Other death camps had faster methods of murdering and incinerating people. Chełmno was not a part of Reinhard. The SS ordered complete demolition of Schlosslager, along with the manor house, which was levelled. To hide the evidence of the SS-committed war crimes, from 1943 onward, the Germans ordered the exhumation of all remains and burning of bodies in open-air cremation pits by a unit of Sonderkommando 1005. The bones were crushed on cement with mallets and added to the ashes. These were transported every night in sacks made of blankets to river Warta (or to the Ner River) on the other side of Zawadka, where they were dumped into the water from a bridge and from a flat-bottomed boat. Eventually, the camp authorities bought a bone-crushing machine (Knochenmühle) from Schriever and Co. in Hamburg to speed up the process.

=== The final extermination phase ===
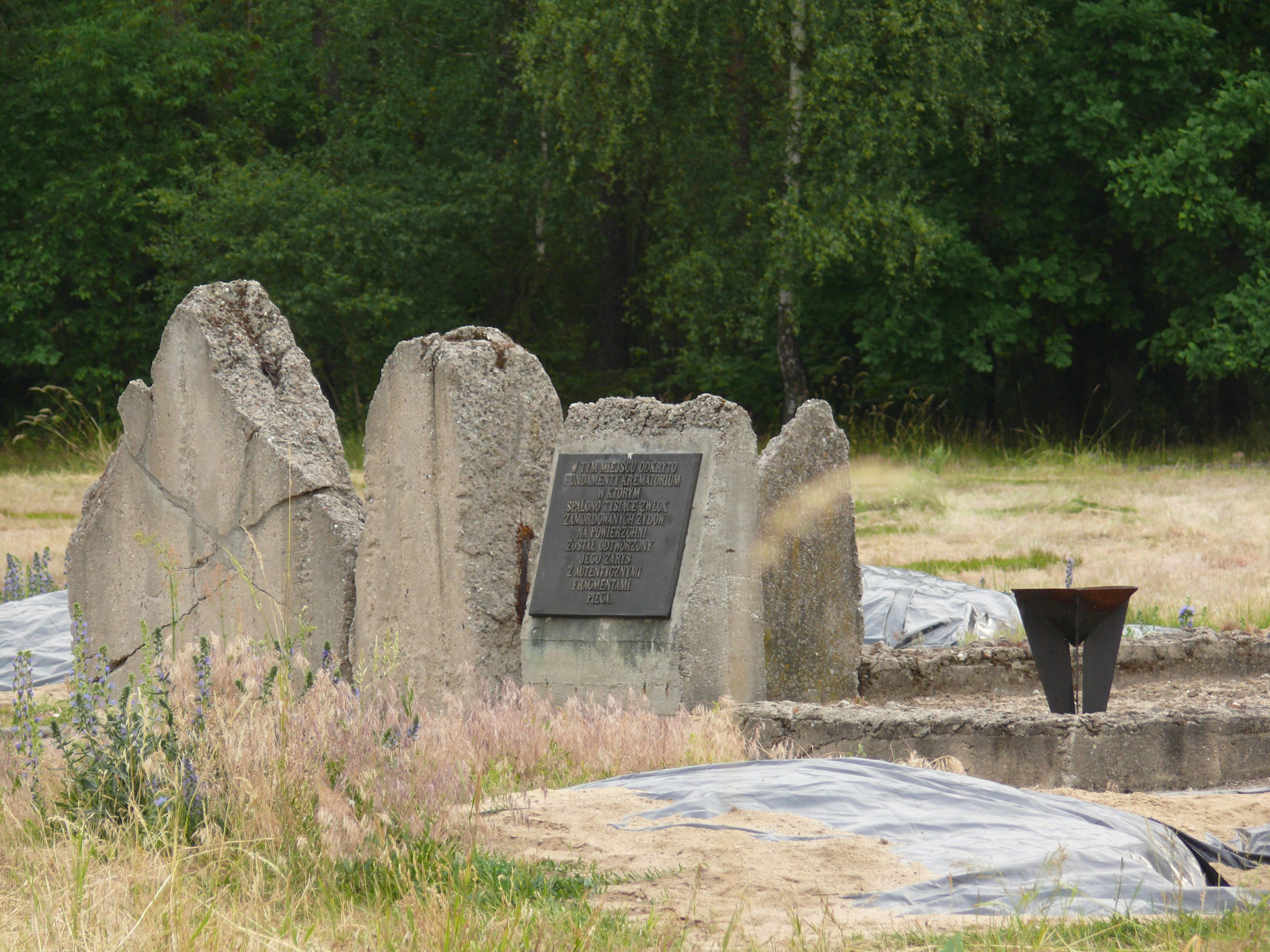
A remnant of the open-air mass cremation structure at the forest camp, with memorial plaque

On June 23, 1944, in spite of earlier demolition of the palace, the SS renewed gassing operations at Chełmno in order to complete the annihilation of the remaining 70,000 Jewish prisoners of the ghetto in Łódź, the last ghetto in occupied Poland to produce war supplies for the Germans. The Special Detachment "Bothmann" returned to the forest and resumed murdering victims at a smaller camp, consisting of brand new wooden barracks along with new crematory pyres.

First, the victims were taken to the desecrated church in Chełmno where they spent the night if necessary, and left their bundles behind on the way to the reception area. They were driven to the forest, where the camp authorities had constructed two fenced-out barracks for undressing before "shower", and two new open-air cremation pits, further up. The SS and police guarded the victims as they took off their clothes and gave up valuables before entering gas-vans. In this final phase of the camp operation, some 25,000 Jews were murdered. Their bodies were burned immediately after death. From mid-July 1944, the SS and police began deporting the remaining inhabitants of the Łódź ghetto to Auschwitz-Birkenau.

In September 1944, the SS brought in a new Commando 1005 of Jewish prisoners from outside the Wartheland District to exhume and cremate remaining corpses and to remove evidence of the mass murder operations. A month later, the SS executed about half of the 80-man detachment after most of the work was done. The gas vans were sent back to Berlin. The remaining Jewish workers were executed just before the German retreat from the Chełmno killing center on January 18, 1945, as the Soviet army approached (it reached the camp two days later). The 15-year-old Jewish prisoner Simon Srebnik was the only one to survive the last executions with a gunshot wound to the head. Historians estimate that the SS murdered at least 152,000–180,000 people at Chełmno between December 1941 and March 1943, and from June 23, 1944, until the Soviet advance. Note: a 1946–47 report by the Central Commission for Investigation of German Crimes in Poland placed the number closer to 340,000 based on a statistical approach, as the camp authorities had destroyed all waybills in an effort to hide their actions.

== Chełmno trials ==
After the war, some Chełmno extermination camp personnel were tried in Poland as well as in other court cases spanning a period of about 20 years. The first judicial trial of three former members of the SS-Sonderkommando Kulmhof, including camp's deputy commandant Oberscharführer Walter Piller, took place in 1945 at the District Court in Łódź. The examination of evidence during the investigation was carried out by Judge Władysław Bednarz. The subsequent four trials, held in Bonn, began in 1962 and concluded three years later in 1965 in Cologne.

Adolf Eichmann testified about the camp during his 1961 war-crimes trial in Jerusalem. He visited it once in late 1942. Simon Srebnik, from the burial Sonderkommando, testified in both the Chelmno Guard and Eichmann trials. Nicknamed Spinnefix at the camp, Srebnik was recognised by the Chelmno Guards only by this moniker. Walter Burmeister, a gas-van driver (not to be confused with the camp's SS-Unterscharfuehrer Walter Burmeister), testified in Bonn in 1967.

== Survivors ==
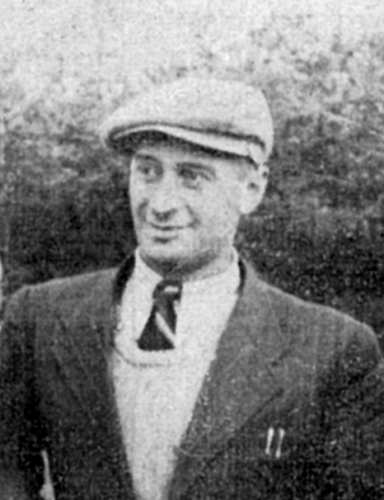
Michał Podchlebnik in 1945

According to the Holocaust Encyclopedia, a total of seven Jews from the burial Sonderkommando escaped from the Waldlager. Determining the identities of the few survivors of Chełmno had presented ambiguity because records use different versions of their names. One survivor may not have been recorded in the early postwar years because he did not testify at trials of camp personnel. Five escaped during the winter of 1942, including Mordechaï Podchlebnik, Milnak Meyer, Abraham Tauber, Abram Roj and Szlama Ber Winer (Szlamek Bajler) whose identity was recognized also as Yakov or Jacob Grojanowski. Mordechaï Zurawski and Simon Srebnik escaped later. Srebnik was among Jews shot by the Germans two days before the Russians entered Chełmno, but he survived. Winer wrote under pseudonym Grojanowski about the operations of the camp in his Grojanowski Report, but he was rounded up with thousands of others and murdered in the gas chamber of Bełżec extermination camp.

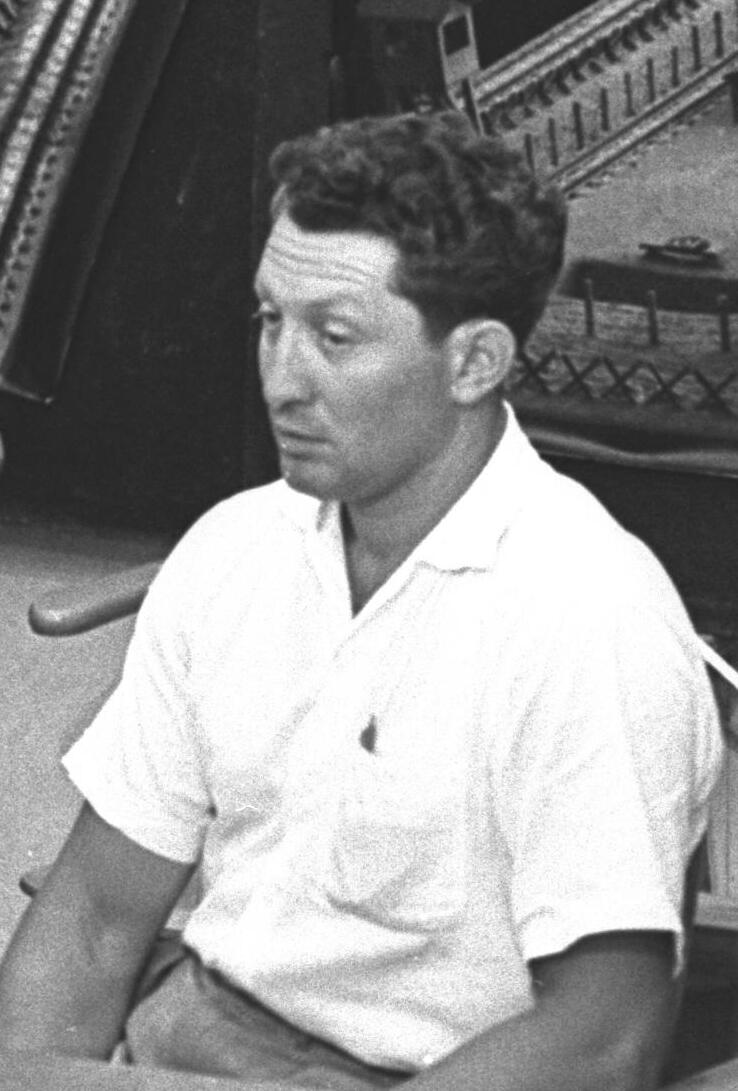
Szymon Srebrnik during the Eichmann trial

In June 1945, both Podchlebnik and Srebnik (then age fifteen), testified at the Chełmno trials of camp personnel in Łódź, Poland. In addition to being included in the Holocaust Encyclopedia, Mordechaï Zurawski is included as survivor in three other sources, each of which documents his testifying, along with Srebnik and Podchlebnik about his experience at Chełmno, at the 1961 trial of Adolf Eichmann in Jerusalem. In addition, Srebnik testified in the Chelmno Guard Trials of 1962–63. The French director Claude Lanzmann included interviews with Srebnik and Podchlebnik in his documentary Shoah, referring to them as the only two Jewish survivors of Chełmno, but this was mistaken. Some sources repeat that only Simon Srebnik and Mordechaï Podchlebnik survived the war but these are also in error. Podchlebnik is sometimes referred to as Michał (or Michael), in Polish and English versions of his name.

Not all escapees have been identified in the postwar period. In 2002 Dr. Sara Roy of Harvard University wrote that her father, Abraham Roy, belonged to the aforementioned survivors. She said that her father was the escapee recognized by the Holocaust Encyclopedia as Abram Roj, although she was mistaken about their total number. Two other survivors of Chełmno include Yitzhak Justman and Yerachmiel Yisrael Widawski who escaped together from the forest burial commando in the winter of 1942. They arrived at Piotrków Trybunalski Ghetto in March 1942 and deposited their testimonies with Rabbi Moshe Chaim Lau. Widawski spoke with Rabbi Lau as well as some members of the prewar Communal Council before he left the ghetto, robbing them of their peace of mind with earth-shattering facts about the extermination process. Widawski saw the bodies of thirteen relatives murdered in gas vans including his own fiancée. Both fugitives, Justman and Widawski, arrived also at the Częstochowa Ghetto and met with Rabbi Chanoch Gad Justman. They headed in various directions, making a great effort to inform and warn the Jewish communities about the fate that awaited them. However, many people refused to believe their stories.

== See also ==
- The Holocaust in occupied Poland
- Kaiser Wilhelm Institute of Anthropology, Human Heredity, and Eugenics
- List of Nazi concentration camps
