= Pabianka =

Location
- Country: Poland

Physical characteristics
- Mouth
  - location: Dobrzynka
  - coordinates: 51.6611°N 19.3607°E

Basin features
- Progression: Dobrzynka→ Ner→ Warta→ Oder→ Baltic Sea

Pabianka is a river of Poland, a tributary of the Dobrzynka in Pabianice.
