= Krzykosy =

Krzykosy may refer to the following places:

- Krzykosy, Gmina Dąbie, Koło County in Greater Poland Voivodeship (central Poland)
- Krzykosy, Gmina Kłodawa, Koło County in Greater Poland Voivodeship (central Poland)
- Krzykosy, Gmina Krzykosy, Środa County in Greater Poland Voivodeship (west-central Poland)
- Krzykosy, Masovian Voivodeship (central Poland)
- Krzykosy, Pomeranian Voivodeship (north Poland)
