= Dobrzynka (river) =

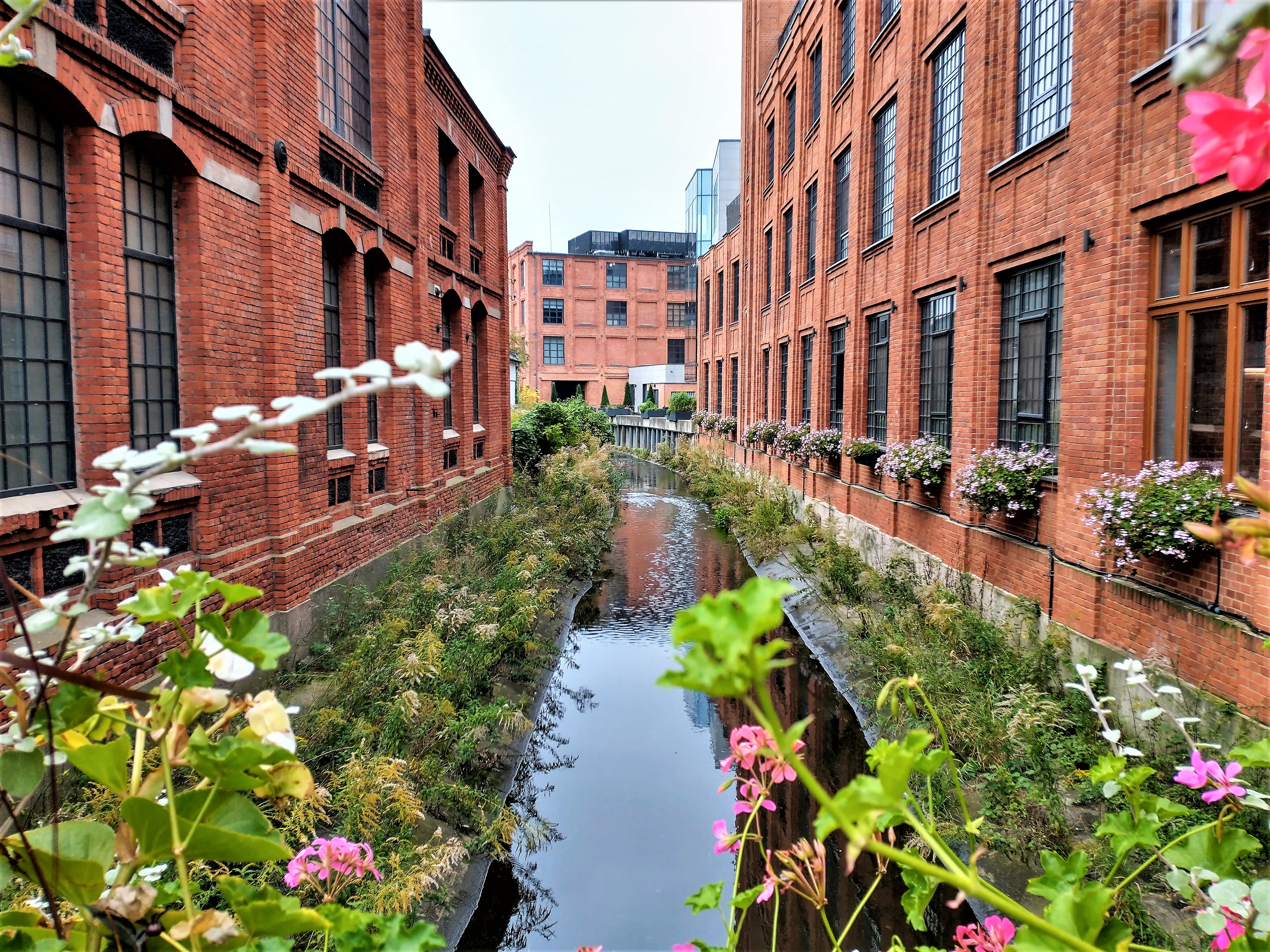
- Dobrzynka River in Pabianice

Location
- Country: Poland

Physical characteristics
- Mouth
  - location: Dobrzynka
  - coordinates: 51.71305°N 19.35611°E

Basin features
- Progression: Dobrzynka→ Ner→ Warta→ Oder→ Baltic Sea

Dobrzynka is a river in central Poland with an approximate length of 25.5 km.

The river flows on the Łódź Upland. The sources of the river are located at an altitude of 250 m above sea level in the village of Górki Duże near Tuszyn. Then it flows through Pabianice and flows into Ner within the administrative boundaries of Łódź at the southwestern border of the city in the fields between Łaskowice and Gorzew above Łaskowice Street at a distance of 1 kilometer from the Lublinek airport and the Łódź Lublinek railway station. The left tributary of the river is Pabianka, in addition to several smaller watercourses on both sides of the river.
