= Leon Young =

Leon Young may refer to:

- Leon Young (Wisconsin politician) (born 1967), American police officer and member of the Wisconsin State Assembly
- Leon Young (mayor) (1924–2001), American politician, mayor of Colorado Springs, Colorado
- Leon Young (musician) (1916–1991), British arranger, conductor and music director

== See also ==
- Leon Young de Blankenheim (1837?–1863), French Army soldier
