= Brdów =

- Village
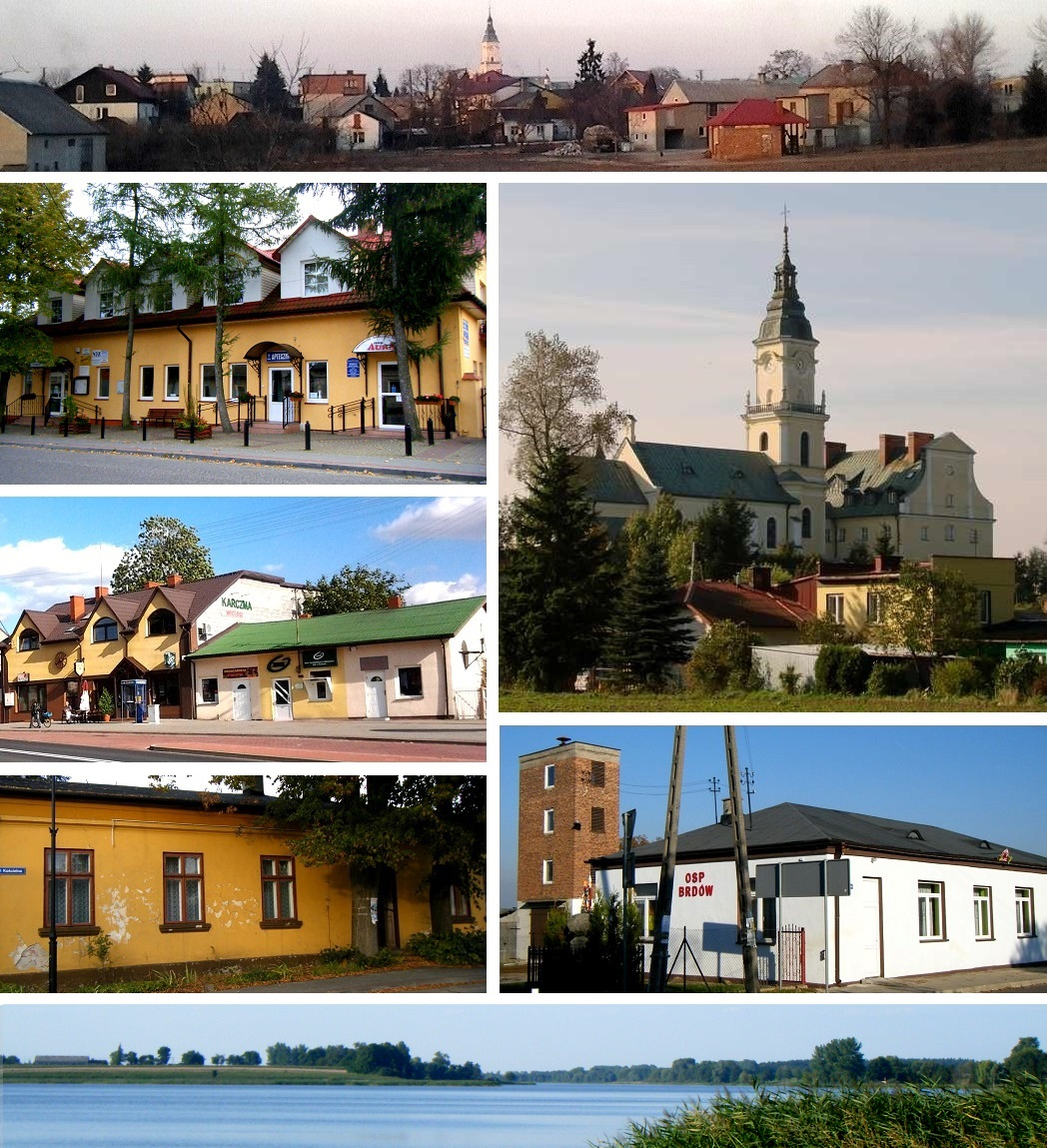
- panorama of Brdów/health center/church of St. Adalbert/center of Brdów/cultural building/fire department/Brdowskie Lake

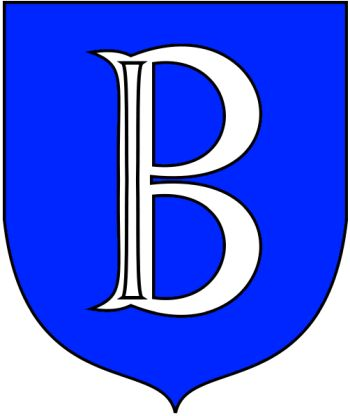
- Coat of arms

- Location within Poland
- Coordinates: 52°21′N 18°43′E
- Country: Poland
- Voivodeship: Greater Poland
- County: Koło
- Gmina: Babiak

Population
  - Total: 900

Brdów [brduf] is a village in the administrative district of Gmina Babiak, within Koło County, Greater Poland Voivodeship, in central Poland.

== History ==
- 3700 BC – The first traces of people in the present Brdów.
- 1136 – The first written mention about Brdów.
- 1325 – The first mention about Catholic parish in Brdów.
- 1399 – The first mention of a brick church.
- 1436:
  - King of Poland Ladislaus of Varna brought to Brdów the Pauline Fathers Order from Jasna Gora and gave them into the care of church in Brdów.
  - Brdów gained town privileges.
- 1450 – Built the first school in Brdów.
- 1476 – City of Brdów became a royal property.
- 1562 – The renewal of civic rights of Brdów by king of Poland Sigismund II Augustus.
- 1584 – Built a hospital in Brdów.
- 1655 – Destruction of the city by the Swedes.
- 1824 – Construction of the factory in Brdów.
- 1863 – Battle of Brdów in Nowiny Brdowskie.
- 1870 – Loss of civic rights.
- 1893 – In Brdów lived 1 894 people.
- 1909 – Built a new building of school (at Church Street).
- 1938 – Built a new building of school (at Adam Mickiewicz Street).
- 1939:
  - Destruction of the town by the Germans.
  - Opened the hospital in place of new school (at Adam Mickiewicz Street).
- 1983:
  - Coronation of Image of Our Lady of Victories of Brdów by Pope John Paul II.
  - Fire of church.
- 1999 – Start of international cooperation with Airėnai (in Lithuania)
- 2004 – The Society of Friends of the Earth of Brdów (Towarzystwo Przyjaciół Ziemi Brdowskiej).
- 2007 – Expansion of the school building.
- 2009 – Construction of new building of kindergarten.
- 2010 – In Brdów was a car accident, which killed 5 people.
- 2011 – Wind farm built in Brdów.

== Famous people ==
Famous people associated with Brdów:

- Andrzej Kreutz-Majewski - stage designer
- Augustyn Kordecki - Pauline monk
- Bronisław Matyszczyk - Pauline monk
- Eleonora Kiełczewska - mother of Pola Negri
- Florian Piskorski - American Polonia activist
- Jakub Krzyżanowski - grandfather of Frédéric Chopin
- Jan Skarbek - nobleman
- Józef Markowski - poet and priest
- Karol Libelt, senior - philosopher
- Karol Libelt, junior - insurgent
- Korneliusz Jemioł - Pauline monk
- Léon Young de Blankenheim - commander of the insurgent troops
- Mieczysław Wejman - Rector of the Academy of Fine Arts in Kraków
- Pola Negri - actress
- Ladislaus of Varna - king of Poland and Lithuanian Grand Duke
- Zachariasz Jabłoński - journalist, theologian and priest

== Church ==
Brdów is a local center of Catholic religion. Here is a St Adalbert's of Prague Church of a Pauline Fathers in Brdów. The church has existed since 1325.

== Population ==
- 1777: 331 people
- 1827: 794 people
- 1859: 863 people
- 1902: 1,894 people
- 1946: 700 people
- 1999: 818 people
- 2002: 850 people
- 2005: 900 people
- 2014: 950 people

== Gallery ==
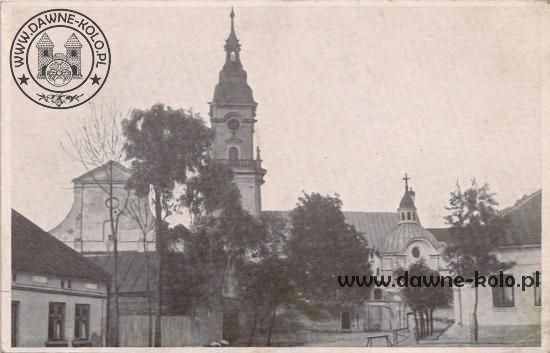
Center of Brdów in 1934

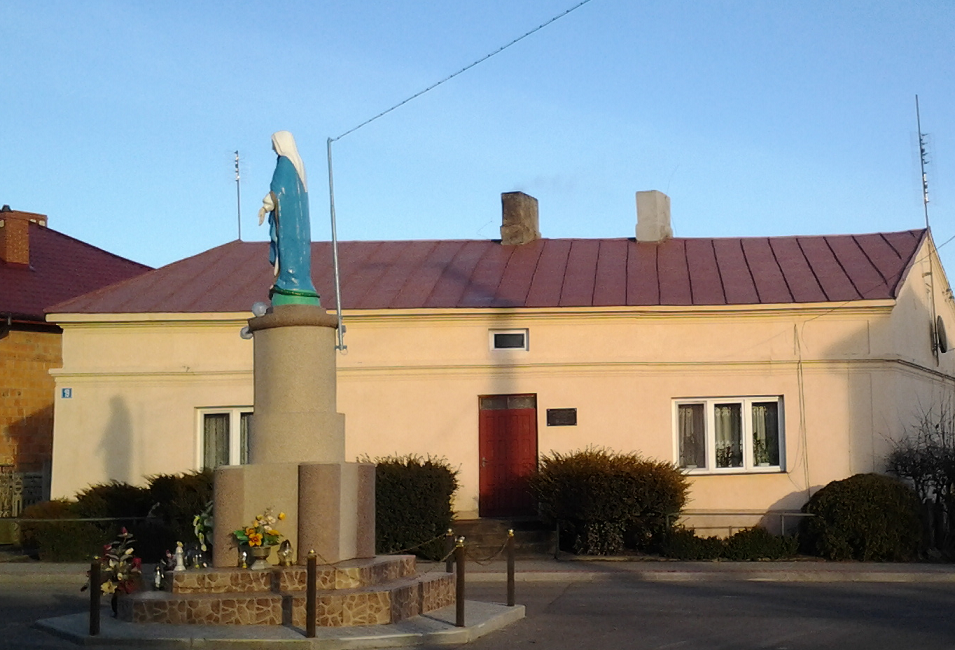
The house where lived the famous actress – Pola Negri

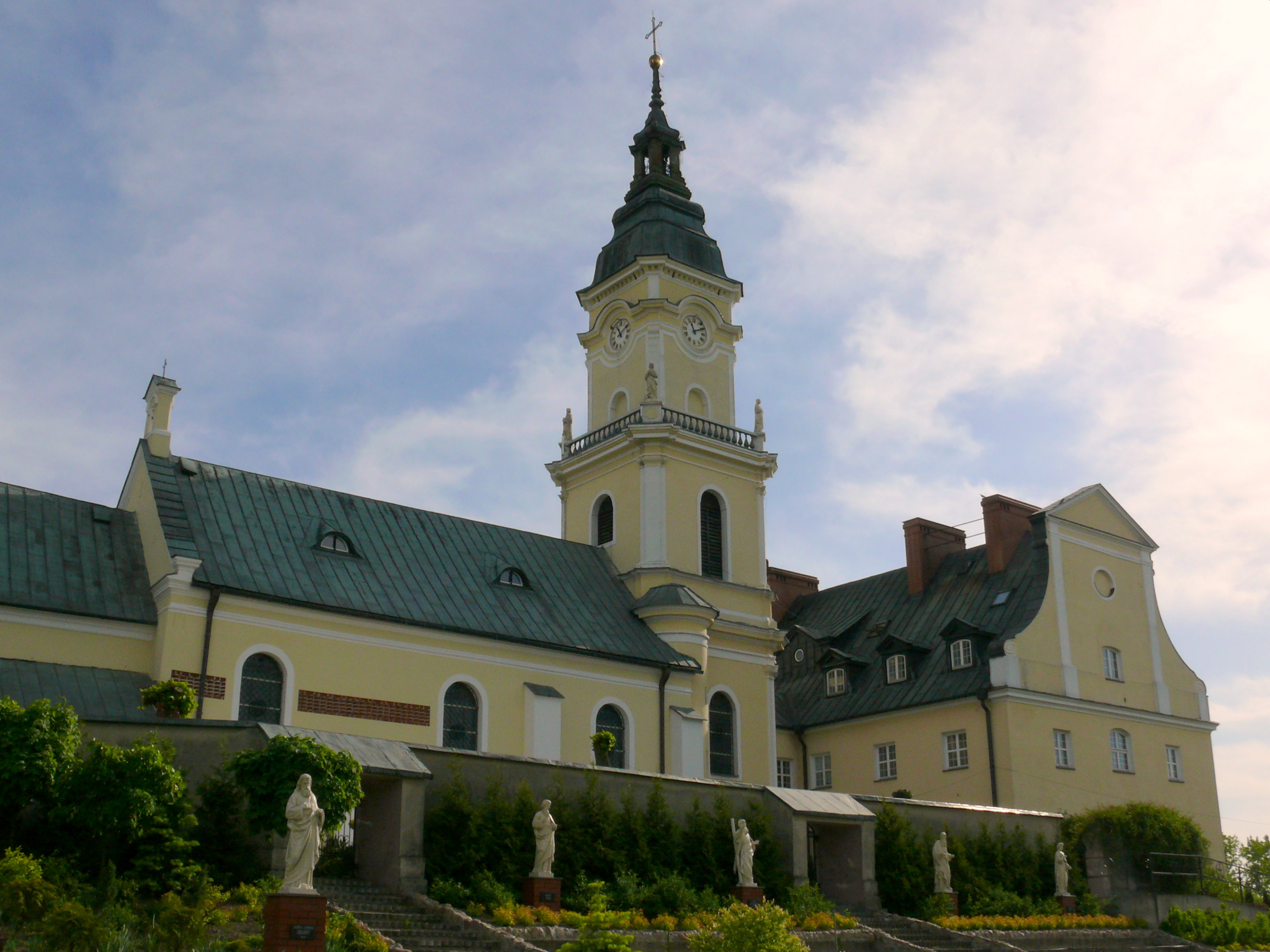
St Adalbert's of Prague church in Brdów, 14th century; 17th century

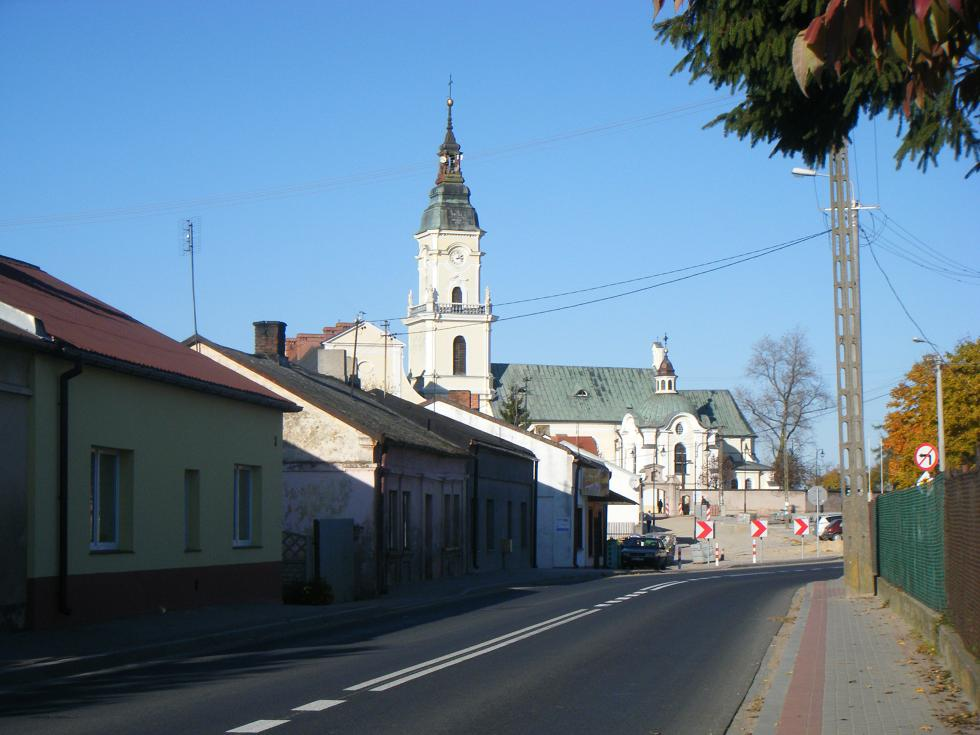
Center of Brdów

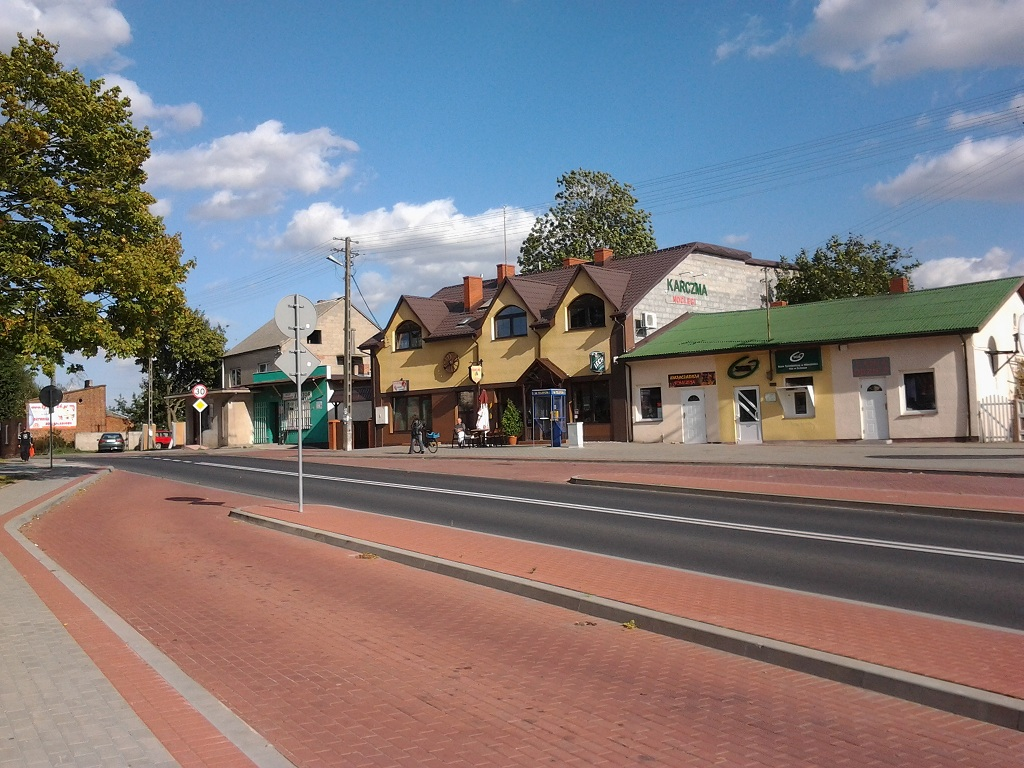
Restaurant "Pod Jesionem" (en:Under the Ash) in center of Brdów

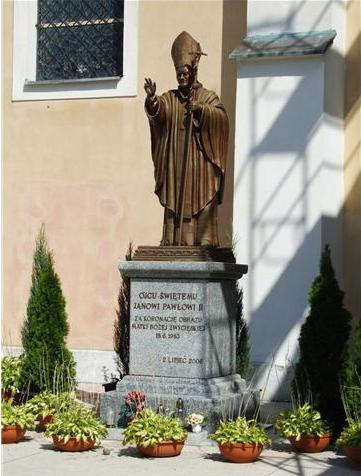
John Paul II monument

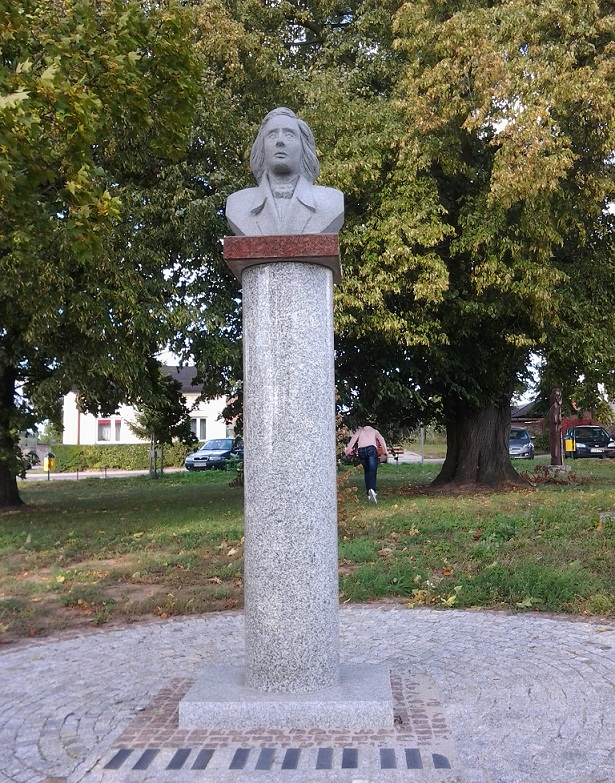
Frédéric Chopin monument

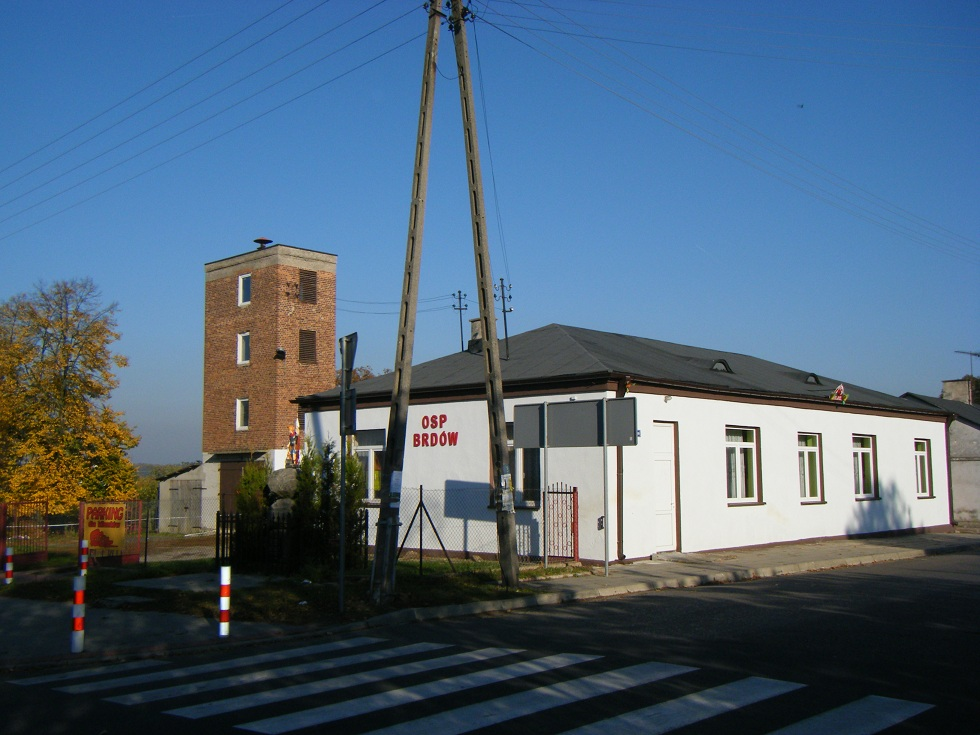
Fire Department in Brdów

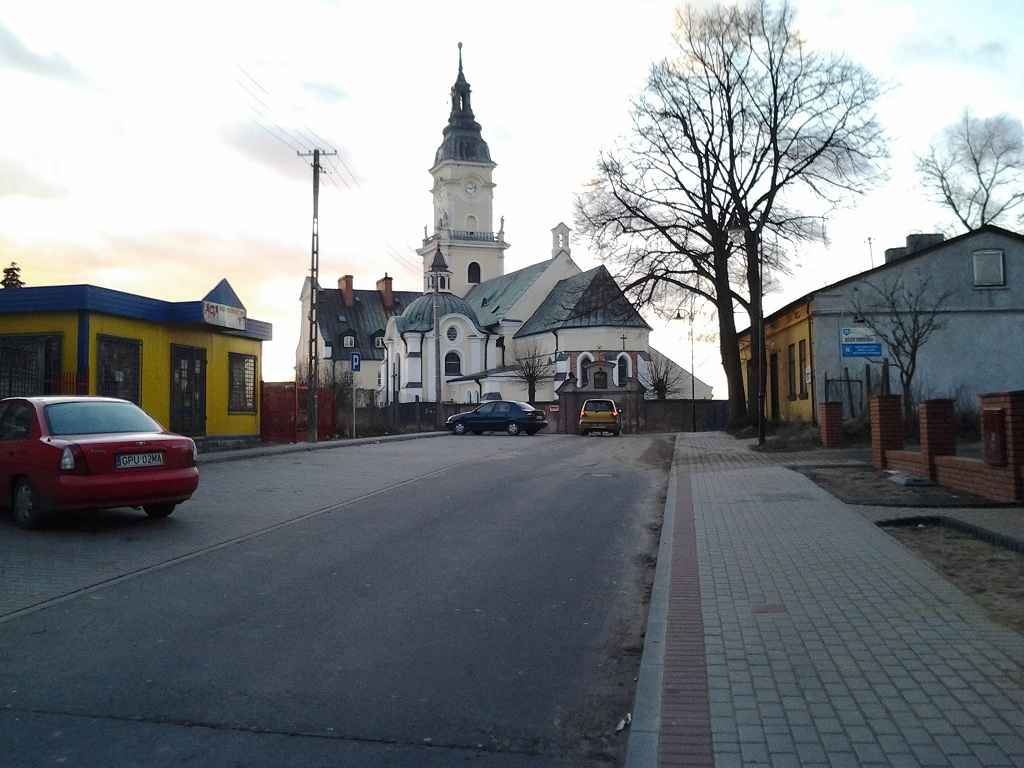
Church Street

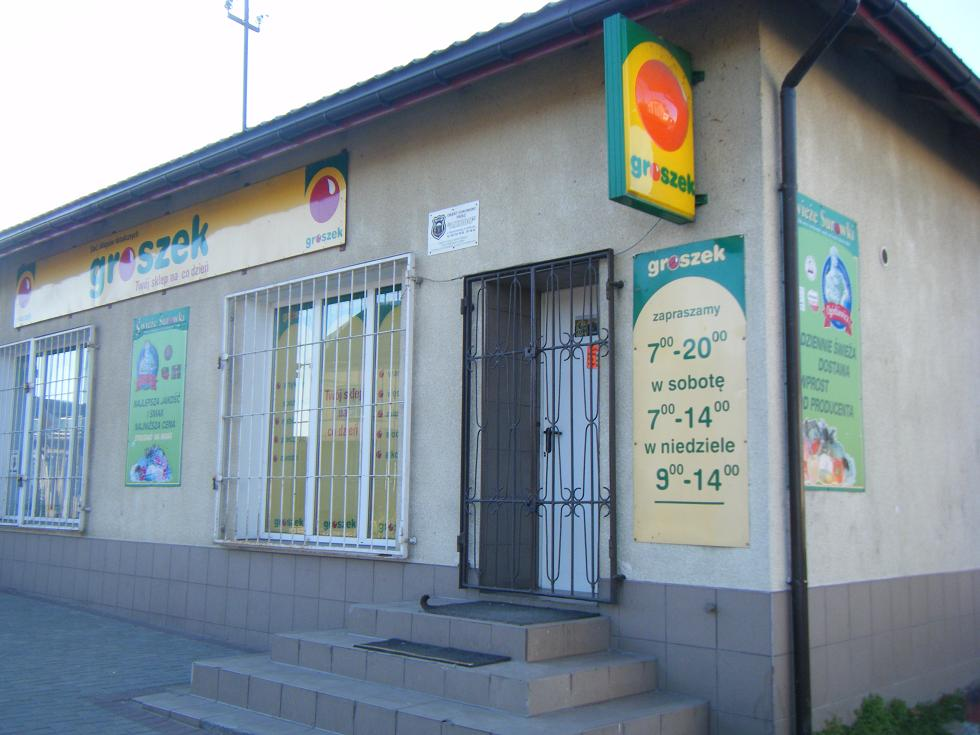
Shop "Groszek" (en:Pea)
