= Gmina Dąbie, Greater Poland Voivodeship =

Gmina Dąbie Dąbie Commune
- Gmina
- Coat of arms

- Coordinates (Dąbie): 52°5′19″N 18°49′32″E
- Country: Poland
- Voivodeship: Greater Poland
- County: Koło
- Seat: Dąbie

Area
  - Total: 130.06 km^{2} (50.22 sq mi)

Population (2006)
  - Total: 6,644
  - Density: 51.08/km^{2} (132.3/sq mi)
  - Urban: 2,087
  - Rural: 4,557
- Time zone: UTC+1 (CET)
  - Summer (DST): UTC+2 (CEST)
- Vehicle registration: PKL

Gmina Dąbie is an urban-rural gmina (administrative district) in Koło County, Greater Poland Voivodeship, in central Poland. Its seat is the town of Dąbie, which lies approximately 19 kilometres (12 mi) south-east of Koło and 135 km (84 mi) east of the regional capital Poznań.

The gmina covers an area of 130.06 square kilometres (50.2 sq mi), and as of 2006 its total population is 6,644 (out of which the population of Dąbie amounts to 2,087, and the population of the rural part of the gmina is 4,557).

== Villages ==
Apart from the town of Dąbie, Gmina Dąbie contains the villages and settlements of Augustynów, Baranowiec, Chełmno nad Nerem, Chełmno-Parcele, Chruścin, Cichmiana, Domanin, Gaj, Grabina Wielka, Karszew, Krzewo, Krzykosy, Kupinin, Ladorudz, Lisice, Lutomirów, Majdany, Rośle Duże, Rzuchów, Sobótka, Tarnówka, Tarnówka Wiesiołowska, Wiesiołów and Zalesie-Kolonia.

== Neighbouring gminas ==
Gmina Dąbie is bordered by the gminas of Brudzew, Grabów, Grzegorzew, Koło, Kościelec, Olszówka, Świnice Warckie and Uniejów.
