= Chełmno-Parcele =

- Village
- Location within Poland
- Coordinates: 52°07′22″N 18°45′39″E
- Country: Poland
- Voivodeship: Greater Poland
- County: Koło
- Gmina: Dąbie

Chełmno-Parcele [ˈxɛu̯mnɔ parˈt͡sɛlɛ] is a village in the administrative district of Gmina Dąbie, within Koło County, Greater Poland Voivodeship, in west-central Poland.
