= Kupinin =

- Village
- Location within Poland
- Coordinates: 52°6′N 18°52′E
- Country: Poland
- Voivodeship: Greater Poland
- County: Koło
- Gmina: Dąbie

Kupinin [kuˈpinin] is a village in the administrative district of Gmina Dąbie, within Koło County, Greater Poland Voivodeship, in west-central Poland.
