= Krzewo, Greater Poland Voivodeship =

Krzewo
- Village
- Location within Poland
- Coordinates: 52°06′15″N 18°54′53″E
- Country: Poland
- Voivodeship: Greater Poland
- County: Koło
- Gmina: Dąbie

Krzewo [ˈkʂɛvɔ] is a village in the administrative district of Gmina Dąbie, within Koło County, Greater Poland Voivodeship, in west-central Poland.
