= Ernst Damzog =

SS member

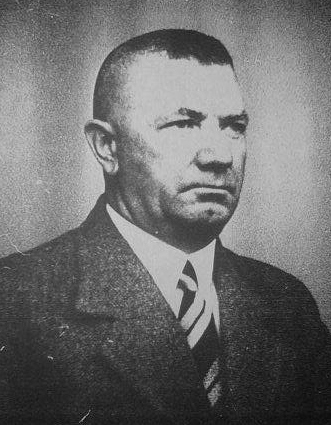
- Damzog in 1935
- Born: 30 October 1882; Strassburg, Alsace–Lorraine, German Empire
- Died: 24 July 1945 (aged 62); Halle, Allied-occupied Germany
- Military career
- Allegiance: Nazi Germany
- Branch: Schutzstaffel
- Service years: 1933–1945
- Rank: SS-Brigadeführer
- Unit: Gestapo
- Commands: Inspekteur der Sicherheitspolizei und des SD, Posen

Ernst Damzog (30 October 1882 – 24 July 1945) was a German policeman, who was a member of the SS of Nazi Germany and served in the Gestapo. He was responsible for the mass murder of Poles and Jews committed in the territory of occupied Poland during World War II.

== Invasion of Poland ==
In September 1939, during the invasion of Poland, SS-Standartenführer Damzog served as the commander of Einsatzgruppe V (EG V-Allenstein), deployed with the 3rd Army (Wehrmacht) in Reichsgau Wartheland (Warthegau), which was carved out of the Polish lands annexed by Nazi Germany. He was responsible for the mass executions of Polish citizens following the victorious Battle of Grudziądz (Graudenz), practically eradicating the entire Jewish population of the town. He was also in control of the execution of medical patients in order to empty state hospitals, which he entrusted to his subordinate officer Herbert Lange. After the annexation of western Poland, Damzog served in occupied Poznań (Posen) as the Inspekteur der Sicherheitspolizei und des SD, under the command of Higher SS and Police Leader SS-Obergruppenführer Wilhelm Koppe sent to Posen on 30 September 1939.

While in Poznań, Damzog was actively involved in the mass expulsions of Poles from Reichsgau Wartheland to the General Government. He personally selected staff for the killing centre in Chełmno extermination camp and supervised its daily operation. The first victims there came from the local villages, and the mass killings with the use of gas vans started on 8 December 1941.

The murders at Chelmno were the precursor to the Final Solution, because the idea of systematic genocide by gassing the able-bodied was not yet fully explored. Damzog is said to have related his 'experiments' to both Wilhelm Koppe and Arthur Greiser.

Damzog was stationed in the Reichsgau until 1945, and promoted to the rank of SS-Brigadeführer as well as Generalmajor in 1944 for his swift anti-Polish and anti-Jewish police actions. Damzog was transferred back to Germany ahead of the Soviet offensive. Ernst Damzog died after the war on 24 July 1945 in Halle.

== See also ==
- Operation Tannenberg extermination action
- Intelligenzaktion targeting Polish elites
- German AB-Aktion in Poland, in spring and summer of 1940
