= Chruścin, Greater Poland Voivodeship =

Chruścin
- Village
- Location within Poland
- Coordinates: 52°5′17″N 18°45′27″E
- Country: Poland
- Voivodeship: Greater Poland
- County: Koło
- Gmina: Dąbie

Chruścin [ˈxruɕt͡ɕin] is a village in the administrative district of Gmina Dąbie, within Koło County, Greater Poland Voivodeship, in west-central Poland.
