= Dąbie, Greater Poland Voivodeship =

Dąbie
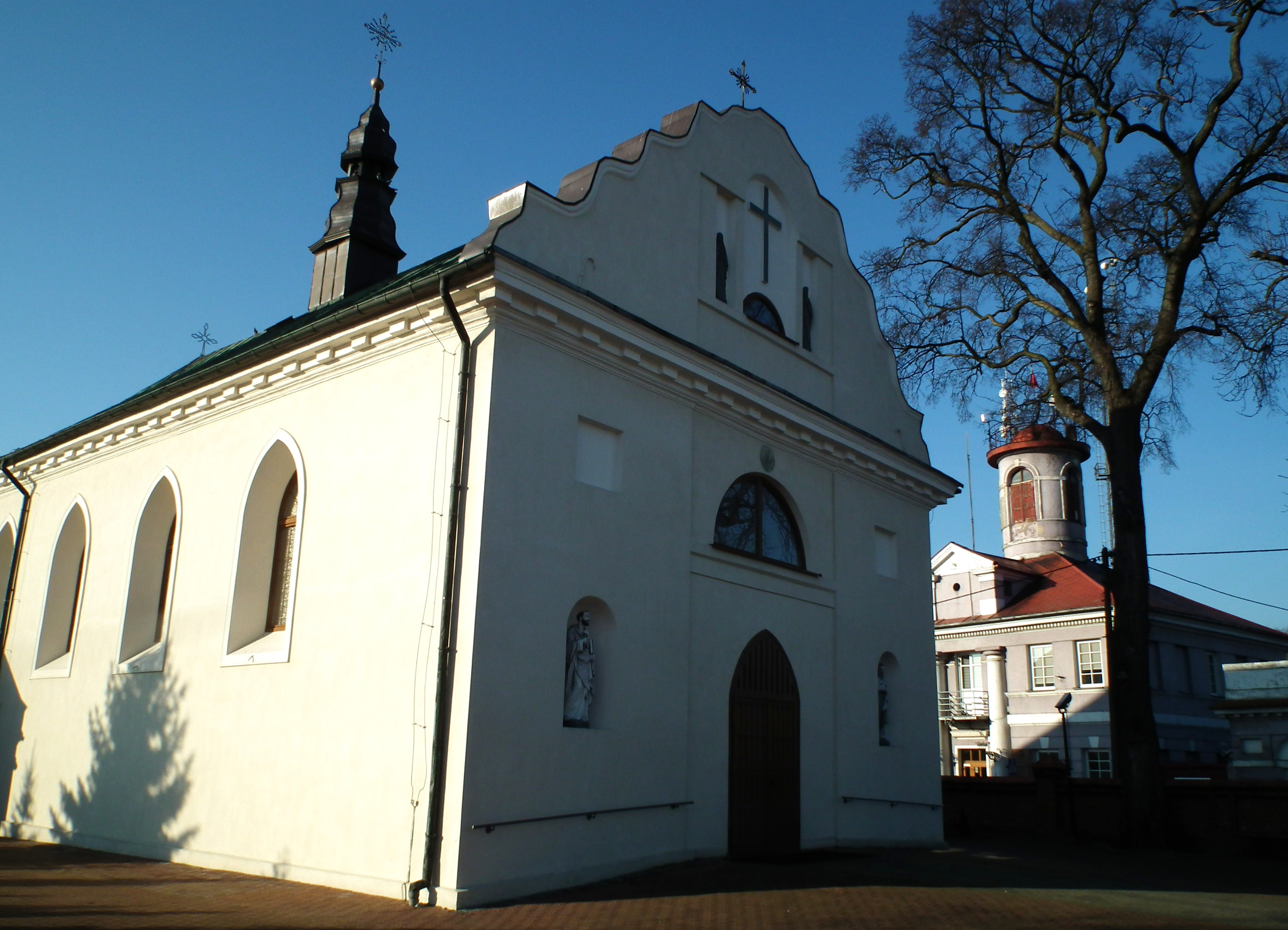
- Saint Nicholas church with town hall in background

- Coat of arms

- Location within Poland
- Coordinates: 52°5′19″N 18°49′32″E
- Country: Poland
- Voivodeship: Greater Poland
- County: Koło
- Gmina: Dąbie

Government
  - Mayor: Tomasz Ludwicki

Area
  - Total: 8.86 km^{2} (3.42 sq mi)

Population (31 December 2021)
  - Total: 1,940
  - Density: 219/km^{2} (567/sq mi)
- Time zone: UTC+1 (CET)
  - Summer (DST): UTC+2 (CEST)
- Postal code: 62-660
- Area code: +48 63
- Vehicle registration: PKL
- Website: http://www.gminadabie.pl/

Dąbie (Polish pronunciation: [ˈdɔmbjɛ]; German: 1940–45 Eichstädt) is a town on the Ner River in central Poland with 1,940 inhabitants as of December 2021. It is situated in Koło County in Greater Poland Voivodeship. It is located within the historic Łęczyca Land. Dabie is situated near several nature trails and is known locally for its scenic walking routes.

== History ==
In the 10th century, the area became part of the emerging Polish state under its first historic ruler Mieszko I. The town was first mentioned in 1232. Municipal status was granted in 1423. It was a royal town, administratively located in the Łęczyca County in the Łęczyca Voivodeship in the Greater Poland Province of the Kingdom of Poland.

Before World War II, about 1,000 Jews lived in Dąbie. During the German occupation, they were confined to a ghetto in summer of 1940. Some were sent to forced labor camps, but most were sent directly to Chełmno extermination camp in December 1941 where they were gassed in specially adapted vans. Only a few Dąbie Jews survived the war. The Polish resistance was active in the town, and Polish underground press was distributed there.

== Transport ==
Dąbie is located at the intersection of Voivodeship roads 263 and 473, and the A2 motorway runs nearby, south of the town.

== Gallery ==
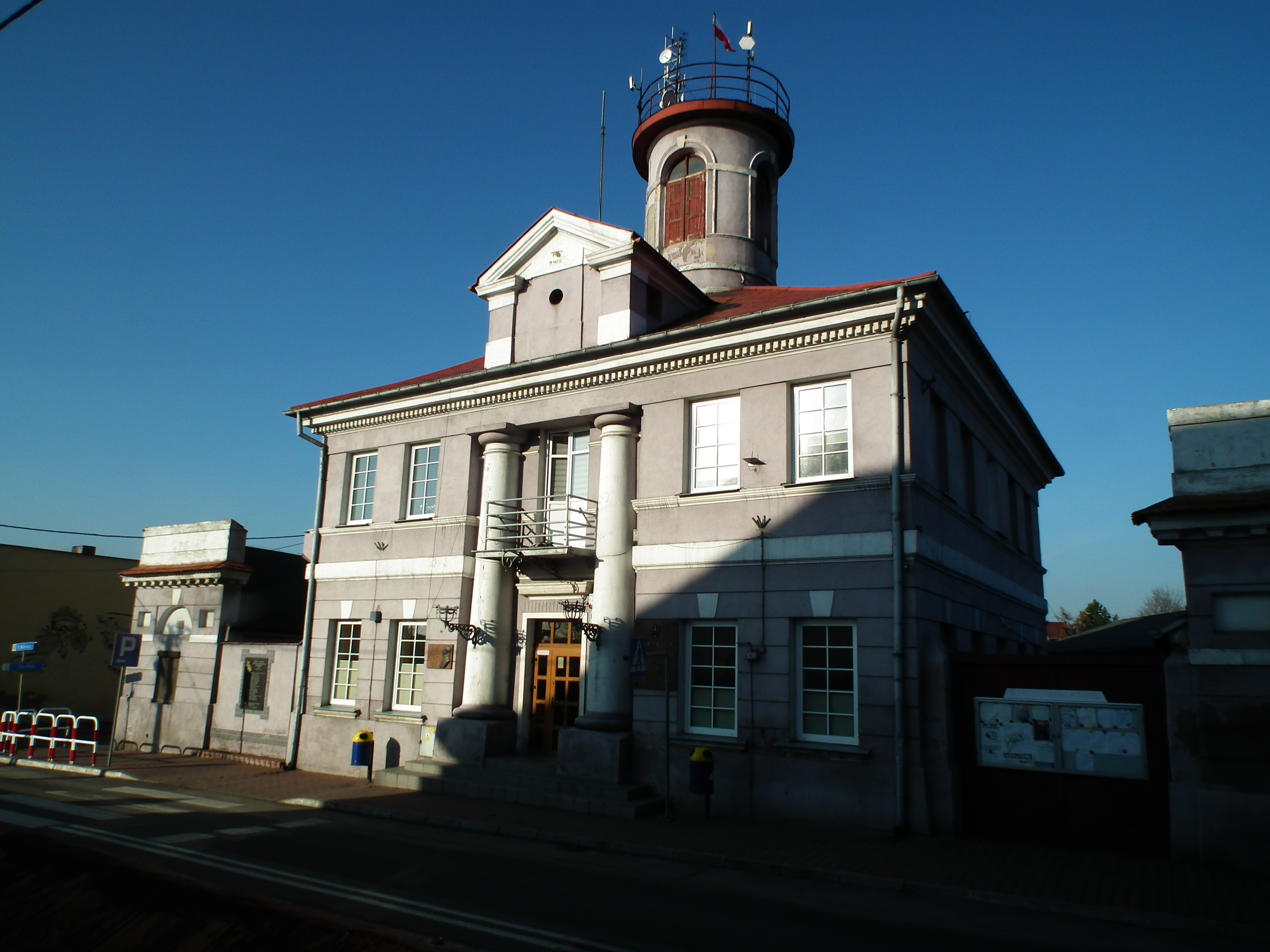
Town hall

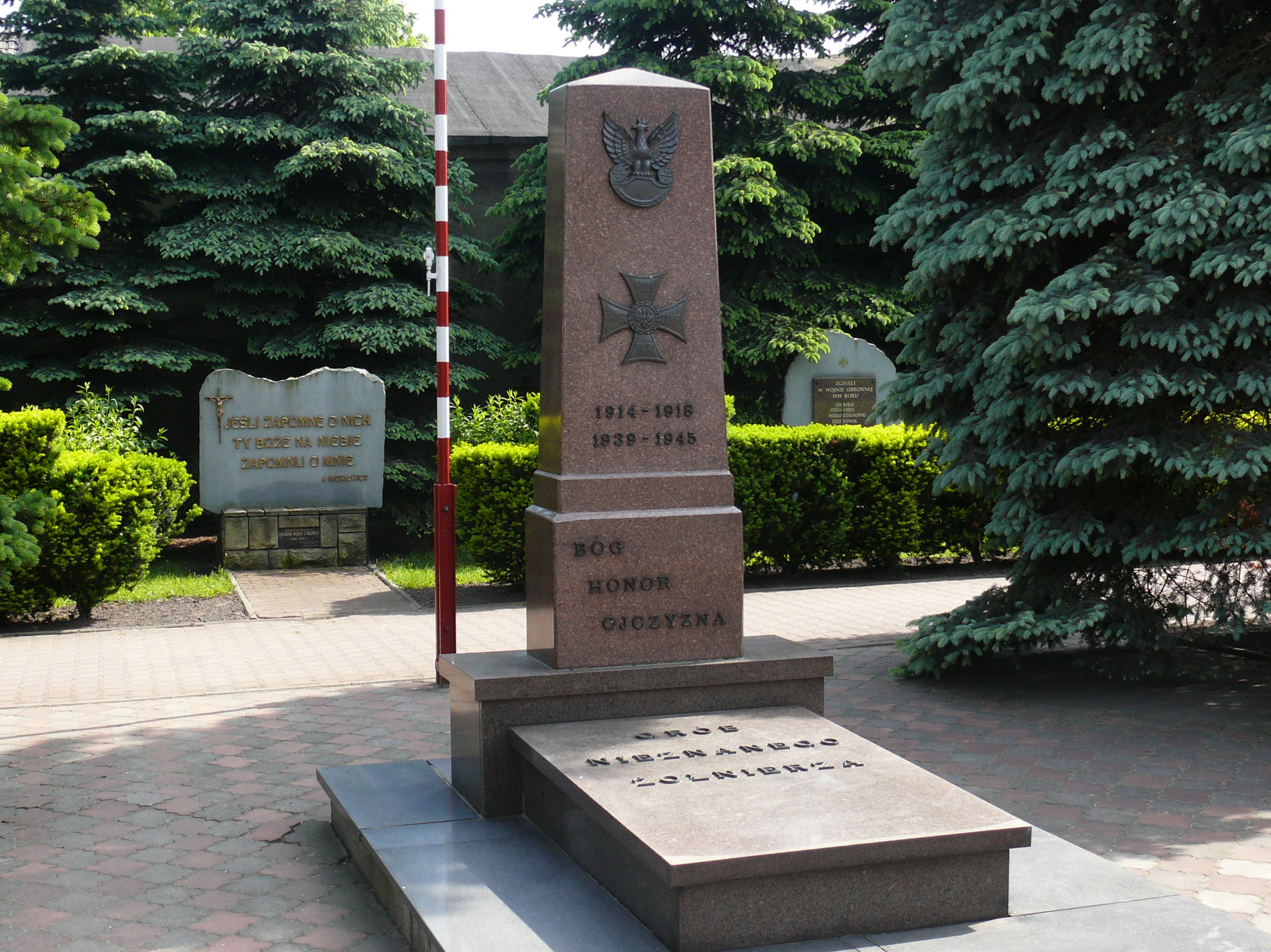
Tomb of the Unknown Soldier

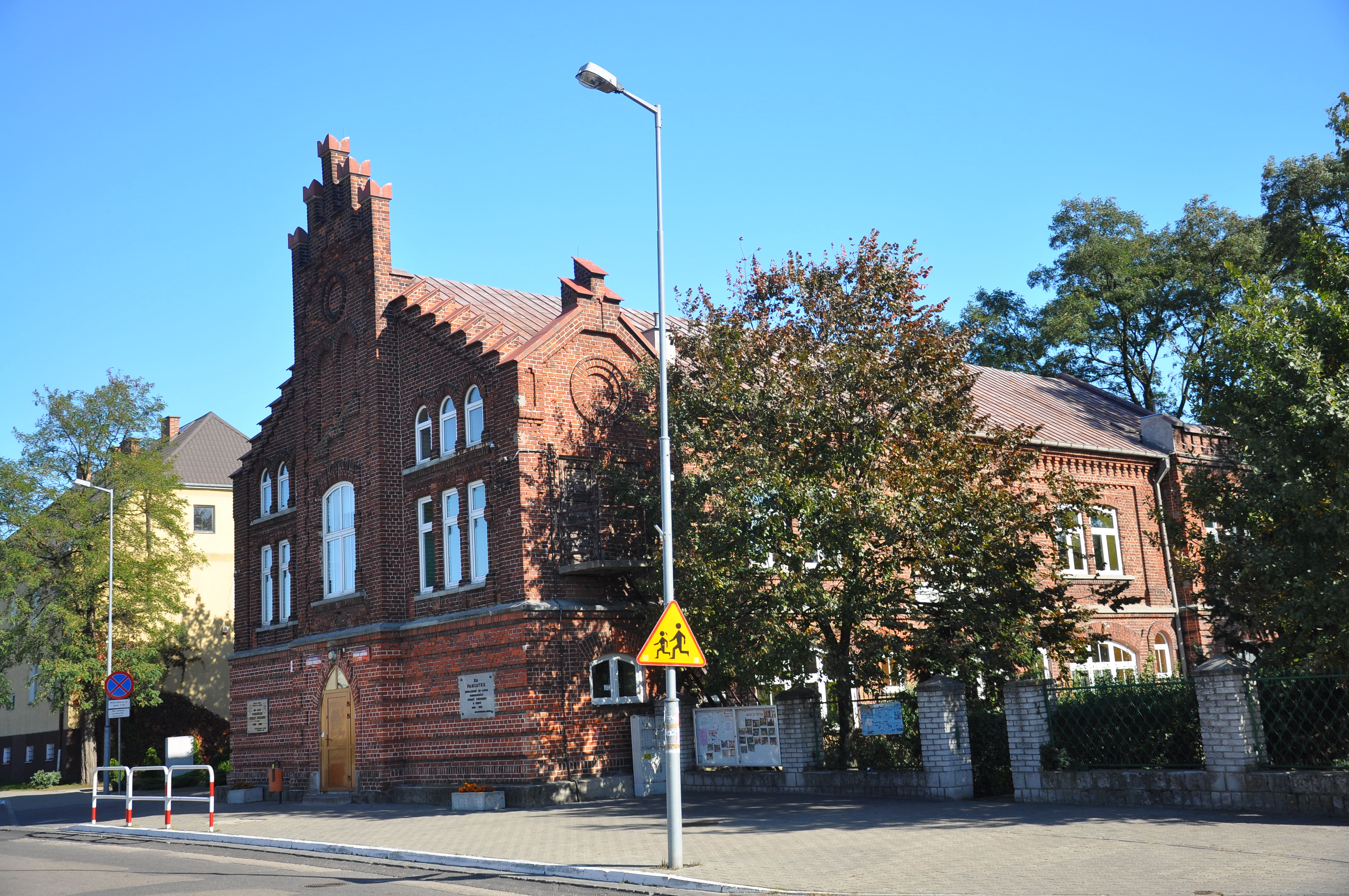
Historic building at 1 Maja Street

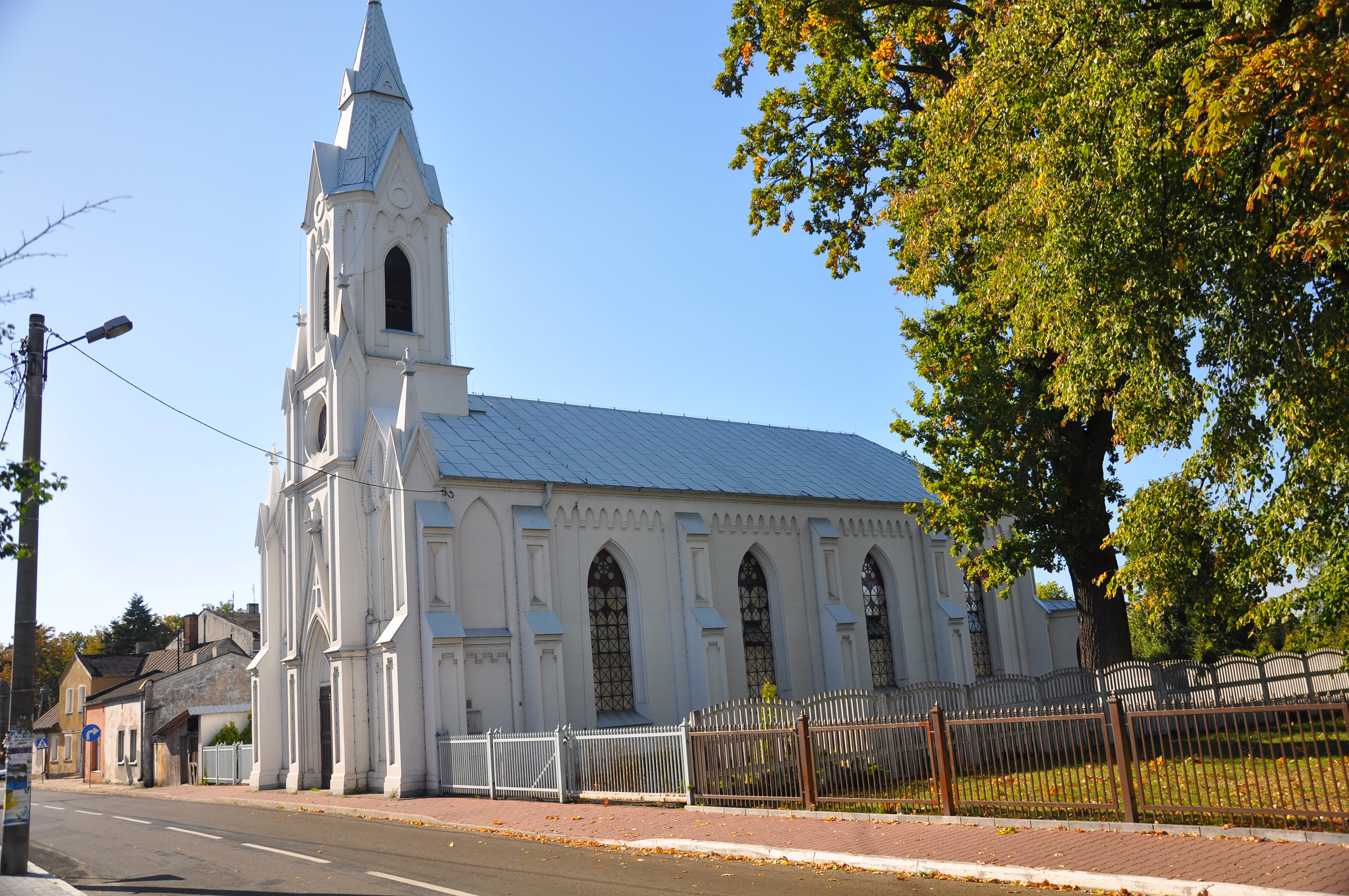
Evangelical church
