= Baranowiec =

- Village
- Location within Poland
- Coordinates: 52°7′N 18°52′E
- Country: Poland
- Voivodeship: Greater Poland
- County: Koło
- Gmina: Dąbie
- Population: 130

Baranowiec [baraˈnɔvjɛt͡s] is a village in the administrative district of Gmina Dąbie, within Koło County, Greater Poland Voivodeship, in west-central Poland.
