= Rzuchów, Greater Poland Voivodeship =

Rzuchów
- Village
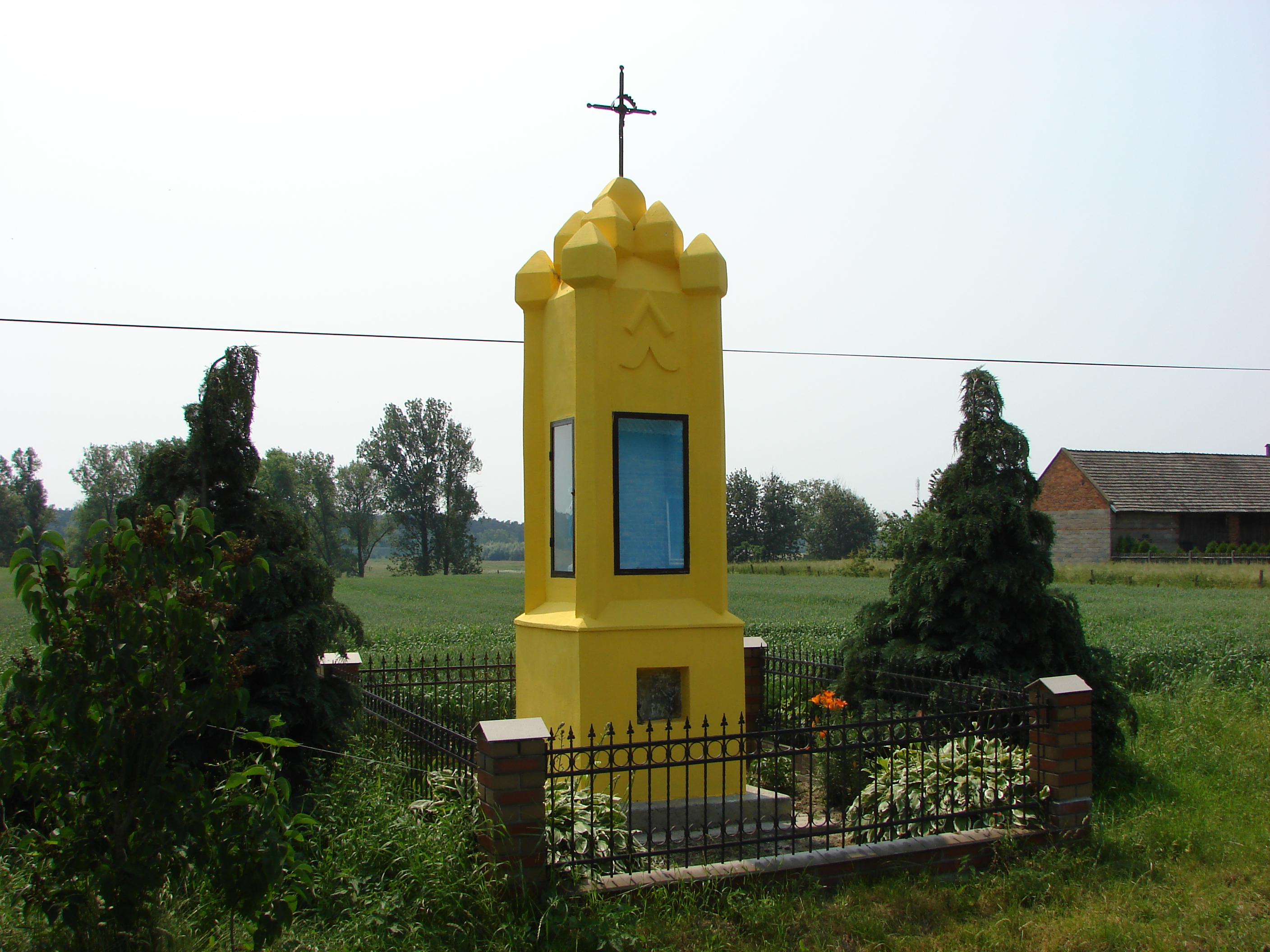
- Wayside shrine in Rzuchów

- Location within Poland
- Coordinates: 52°7′N 18°43′E
- Country: Poland
- Voivodeship: Greater Poland
- County: Koło
- Gmina: Dąbie
- Time zone: UTC+1 (CET)
  - Summer (DST): UTC+2 (CEST)
- Vehicle registration: PKL

Rzuchów [ˈʐuxuf] is a village in the administrative district of Gmina Dąbie, within Koło County, Greater Poland Voivodeship, in central Poland.

== History ==
According to the 1921 census, the village with the adjacent colony had a population of 673, entirely Polish by nationality and 97.6% Roman Catholic and 2.2% Lutheran by confession.

During the German occupation of Poland (World War II), the forest of Rzuchów was the site of German massacres of Poles, who were previously imprisoned in the nearby town of Koło (see Nazi crimes against the Polish nation). On 11 November 1939 the German police murdered 80 people there.

== Transport ==
The Polish A2 motorway runs near Rzuchów, south of the village.
