= Domanin, Koło County =

Domanin
- Village
- Location within Poland
- Coordinates: 52°04′25″N 18°49′28″E
- Country: Poland
- Voivodeship: Greater Poland
- County: Koło
- Gmina: Dąbie

Domanin [dɔˈmanin] is a village in the administrative district of Gmina Dąbie, within Koło County, Greater Poland Voivodeship, in west-central Poland.
