= Augustynów, Koło County =

Augustynów
- Village
- Location within Poland
- Coordinates: 52°5′N 18°44′E
- Country: Poland
- Voivodeship: Greater Poland
- County: Koło
- Gmina: Dąbie
- Population: 160

Augustynów [auɡusˈtɨnuf] is a village in the administrative district of Gmina Dąbie, within Koło County, Greater Poland Voivodeship, in west-central Poland.
