= Ladorudz, Koło County =

Ladorudz
- Village
- Location within Poland
- Coordinates: 52°08′26″N 18°46′31″E
- Country: Poland
- Voivodeship: Greater Poland
- County: Koło
- Gmina: Dąbie

Ladorudz [laˈdɔrut͡s] is a village in the administrative district of Gmina Dąbie, within Koło County, Greater Poland Voivodeship, in west-central Poland.
