= Lisice, Greater Poland Voivodeship =

Lisice
- Village
- Location within Poland
- Coordinates: 52°06′56″N 18°56′12″E
- Country: Poland
- Voivodeship: Greater Poland
- County: Koło
- Gmina: Dąbie

Lisice [liˈɕit͡sɛ] is a village in the administrative district of Gmina Dąbie, within Koło County, Greater Poland Voivodeship, in west-central Poland.
