= Chełmno nad Nerem =

- Village
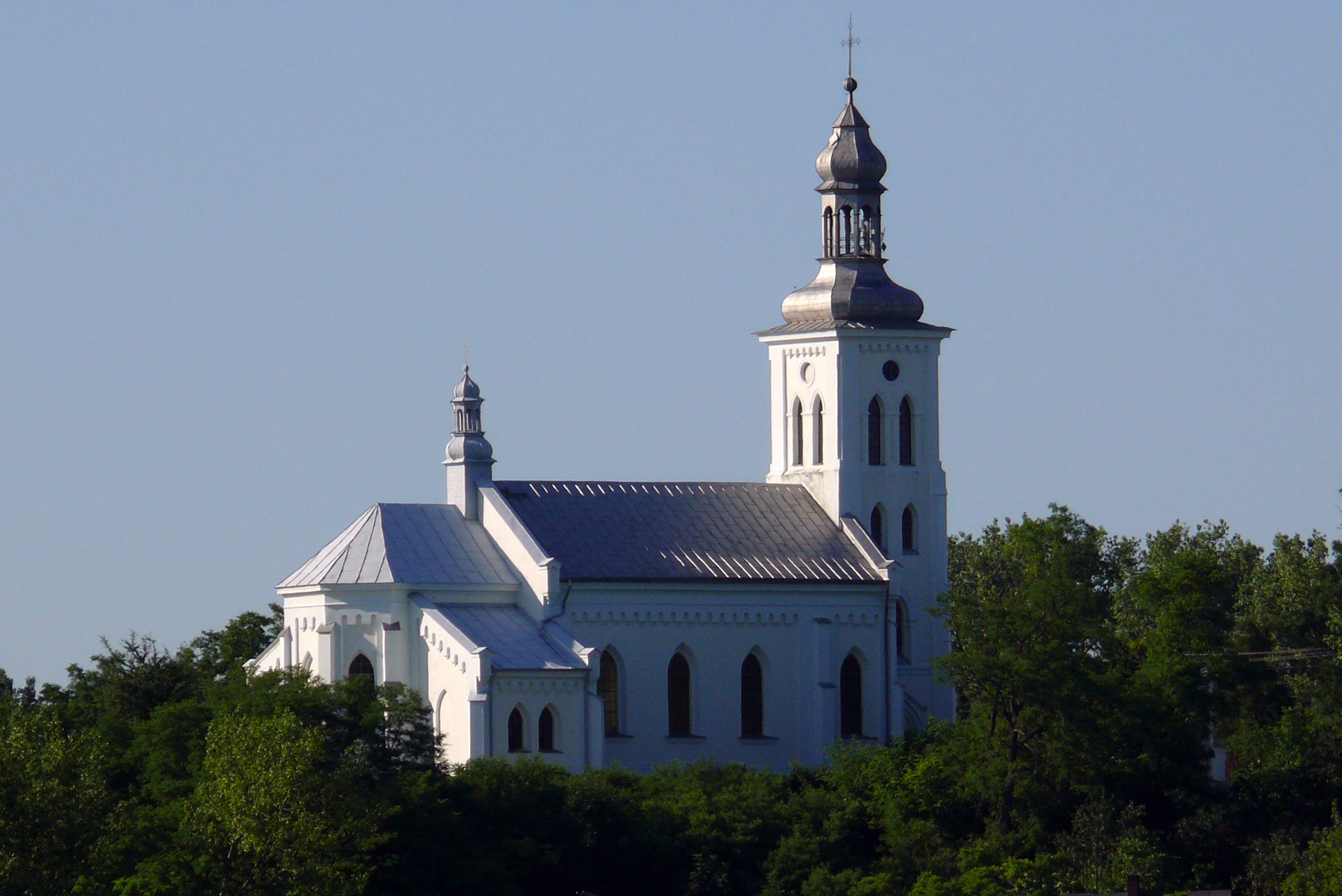
- Church of the Nativity of the Virgin Mary in Chełmno, where during World War II Jews were held overnight prior to their transfer to the old Chełmno castle, which served as an extermination camp.
- Interactive map of Chełmno nad Nerem
- Location within Poland
- Coordinates: 52°6′49″N 18°44′55″E
- Country: Poland
- Voivodeship: Greater Poland
- County: Koło
- Gmina: Dąbie
- Population: 350
- Time zone: UTC+1 (CET)
  - Summer (DST): UTC+2 (CEST)
- Vehicle registration: PKL

Chełmno, often known by its full name Chełmno nad Nerem (pronounced [ˈxɛu̯mnɔ ˌnad ˈnɛrɛm]; meaning Chełmno on the Ner river) is a village in the administrative district of Gmina Dąbie, within Koło County, Greater Poland Voivodeship, in west-central Poland. The village has a population of 350. It is the location of the Chełmno Extermination Camp Museum founded in 1994.

== History ==
The oldest known mention of the village comes from the Bull of Gniezno of 1136. In 1284, Duke of Greater Poland and future King of Poland Przemysł II, confirmed the donation of the village to the Archdiocese of Gniezno. A local parish church surely existed already in 1521. Jan Łaski turned the village into a town, which was confirmed by King Sigismund I the Old of Poland in 1530; however, soon Chełmno became a village again. Administratively it was located in the Łęczyca County in the Łęczyca Voivodeship in the Greater Poland Province of the Polish Crown.

In the Second Partition of Poland, in 1793, the village was annexed by Prussia. In 1807, it was regained by Poles and included within the short-lived Duchy of Warsaw, and following the duchy's dissolution in 1815, it fell to the Russian Partition of Poland. In 1827, the village had a population of 335. During the January Uprising, on October 7, 1863, a Polish insurgent unit repulsed a Cossack attack near Chełmno. Following World War I, in 1918, Poland regained independence and control of the village.

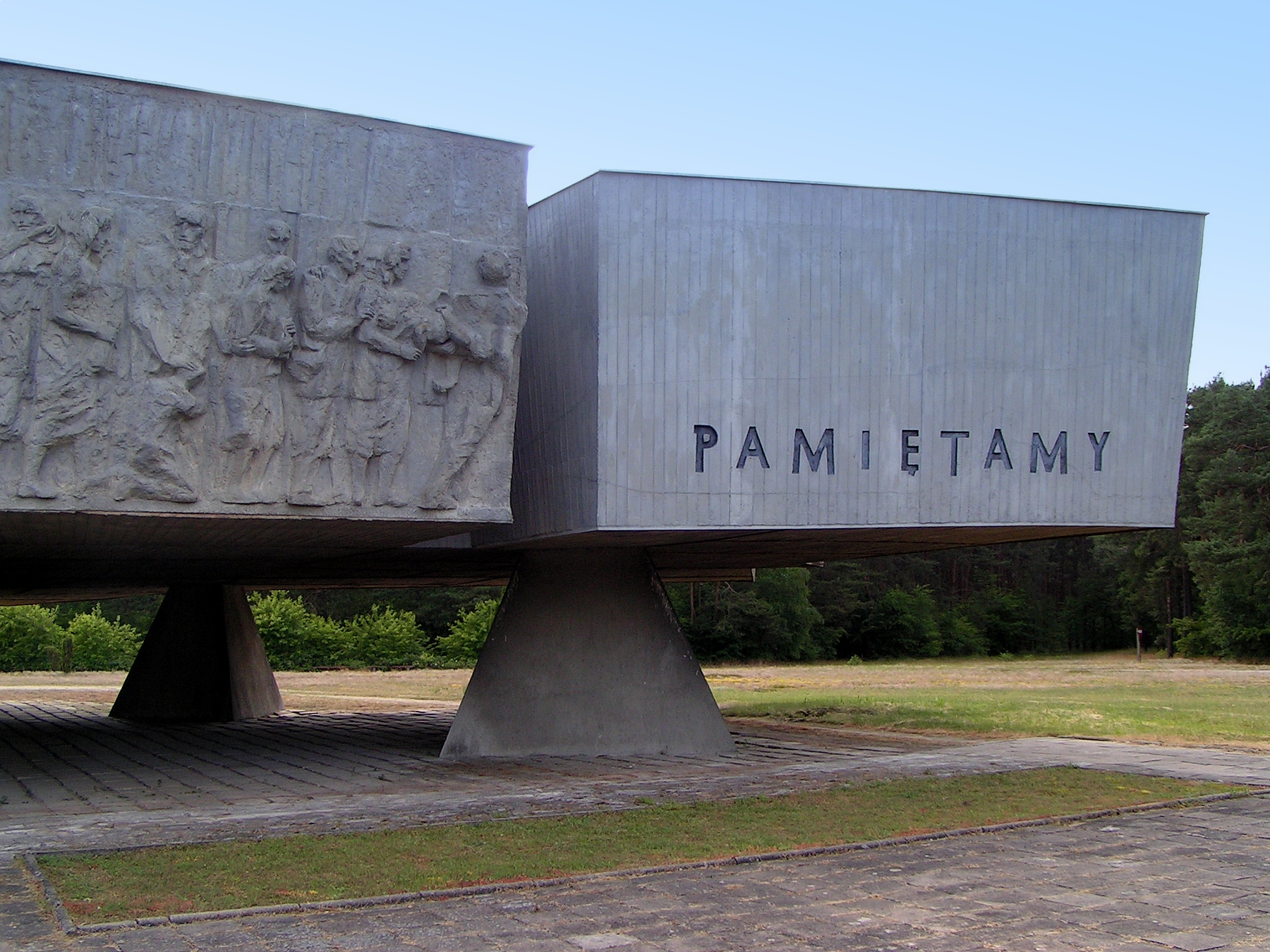
Memorial at the site of the former death camp

During World War II, from 1939 to 1945, the village was occupied by Germany, which renamed it German: Kulmhof an der Nehr. It is the historic site of the Chełmno extermination camp, operated in 1941–1945 by Nazi Germany.

In 1987, the Holocaust Museum in Chełmno was established as branch of the District Museum in Konin. The site has been the subject of historical studies for decades, and a lot of preliminary work has already been done between 1961 and 1964; but also, serious mistakes were made at that time, for example, the remnants of the original gas van were not saved.

In the 1980s, aerial photography was used to map out the precise location of the mass graves, the barracks and the field crematorium. Further archaeological studies were conducted, and the foundations of various camp structures were unearthed and preserved, including the Las rzuchowski (Rzuchowski forest) cemetery. They were followed by archival research and interviews with the locals. The construction of the actual museum began in 1988. It was inaugurated on 17 June 1990, along with the newly built Wall of Remembrance 37.5 meters (123 feet) long. The new memorials are still being added to the site. The camp museum is visited by around 50,000 guests annually.
