= Majdany, Koło County =

Majdany
- Village
- Location within Poland
- Coordinates: 52°08′40″N 18°42′21″E
- Country: Poland
- Voivodeship: Greater Poland
- County: Koło
- Gmina: Dąbie

Majdany (Polish pronunciation: [majˈdanɨ]) is a village in the administrative district of Gmina Dąbie, within Koło County, Greater Poland Voivodeship, in west-central Poland.
