= Lutomirów =

- Village
- Location within Poland
- Coordinates: 52°6′N 18°43′E
- Country: Poland
- Voivodeship: Greater Poland
- County: Koło
- Gmina: Dąbie

Lutomirów [lutɔˈmiruf] is a village in the administrative district of Gmina Dąbie, within Koło County, Greater Poland Voivodeship, in west-central Poland.
