= Rośle Duże =

- Village
- Location within Poland
- Coordinates: 52°07′26″N 18°54′45″E
- Country: Poland
- Voivodeship: Greater Poland
- County: Koło
- Gmina: Dąbie

Rośle Duże [ˈrɔɕlɛ ˈduʐɛ] is a village in the administrative district of Gmina Dąbie, within Koło County, Greater Poland Voivodeship, in west-central Poland.
