= Wiesiołów, Greater Poland Voivodeship =

Wiesiołów
- Village
- Location within Poland
- Coordinates: 52°6′9″N 18°51′2″E
- Country: Poland
- Voivodeship: Greater Poland
- County: Koło
- Gmina: Dąbie
- Population: 303
- Time zone: UTC+1 (CET)
  - Summer (DST): UTC+2 (CEST)
- Vehicle registration: PKL

Wiesiołów [vjɛˈɕɔwuf] is a village in the administrative district of Gmina Dąbie, within Koło County, Greater Poland Voivodeship, in central Poland.
