= Gaj, Koło County =

Gaj
- Village
- Location within Poland
- Coordinates: 52°06′47″N 18°42′22″E
- Country: Poland
- Voivodeship: Greater Poland
- County: Koło
- Gmina: Dąbie

Gaj [ɡai̯] is a village in the administrative district of Gmina Dąbie, within Koło County, Greater Poland Voivodeship, in west-central Poland.
