= Krzykosy, Gmina Dąbie =

Krzykosy
- Village
- Location within Poland
- Coordinates: 52°04′21″N 18°43′42″E
- Country: Poland
- Voivodeship: Greater Poland
- County: Koło
- Gmina: Dąbie

Krzykosy [kʂɨˈkɔsɨ] is a village in the administrative district of Gmina Dąbie, within Koło County, Greater Poland Voivodeship, in west-central Poland.
