= Leon Young de Blankenheim =

French Army soldier

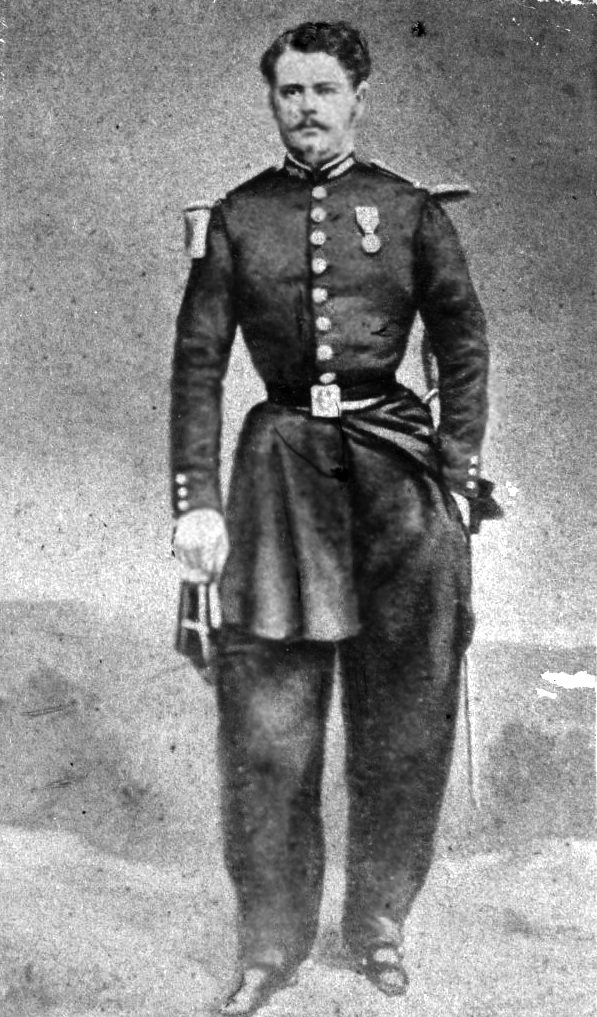
Leon Young

Leon Young de Blankenheim (1837? – April 29, 1863 in Nowiny Brdowskie) was a French Army soldier, who was promoted to the rank of colonel of Polish rebels during the January Uprising in the former Polish-Lithuanian Commonwealth against the Russian Empire on April 26, 1863.

De Blankenheim was a volunteer who came to Congress Poland to participate in the anti-Russian rebellion. In March 1863, he was named commandant of a rebel unit, created by the Działyński Committee from Poznań. De Blankenheim participated in fighting in Kujawy, and he was killed in action in Nowiny Brdowskie on April 29, 1863. His body was buried in a parish cemetery in Brdów, while a monument dedicated to him and other rebels was erected in Nowiny Brdowskie.

== Sources ==
- Powstanie styczniowe i zeslancy syberyjscy. Katalog fotografii ze zbiorow Muzeum Historycznego m. st. Warszawy, t. I, Warszawa 2004
