= Nowiny Brdowskie =

- Village
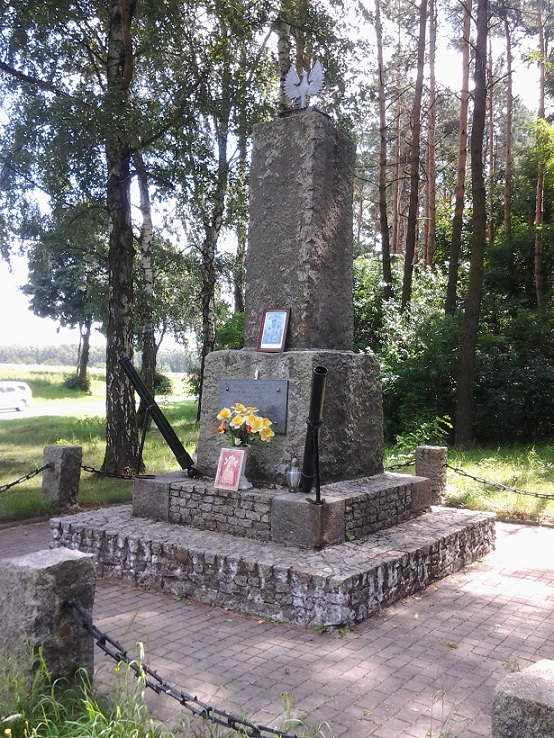
- Monument to the January Insurgents from the 1863 Battle of Brdów

- Location within Poland
- Coordinates: 52°20′N 18°45′E
- Country: Poland
- Voivodeship: Greater Poland
- County: Koło
- Gmina: Babiak

Population
  - Total: 70
- Time zone: UTC+1 (CET)
  - Summer (DST): UTC+2 (CEST)
- Vehicle registration: PKL

Nowiny Brdowskie [nɔˈvinɨ ˈbrdɔfskʲɛ] is a village in the administrative district of Gmina Babiak, within Koło County, Greater Poland Voivodeship, in central Poland.

== Monument to the January Insurgents ==
In the village there is a monument that commemorates the Battle of Brdów against the Russian Empire, which occurred on April 29, 1863, during the January Uprising. In the battle at Nowiny Brdowskie died Léon Young de Blankenheim, a French Army soldier, who was promoted to the rank of colonel of the Polish insurgent army. The insurgents lost 68 men.
