= Ner =

River in Poland

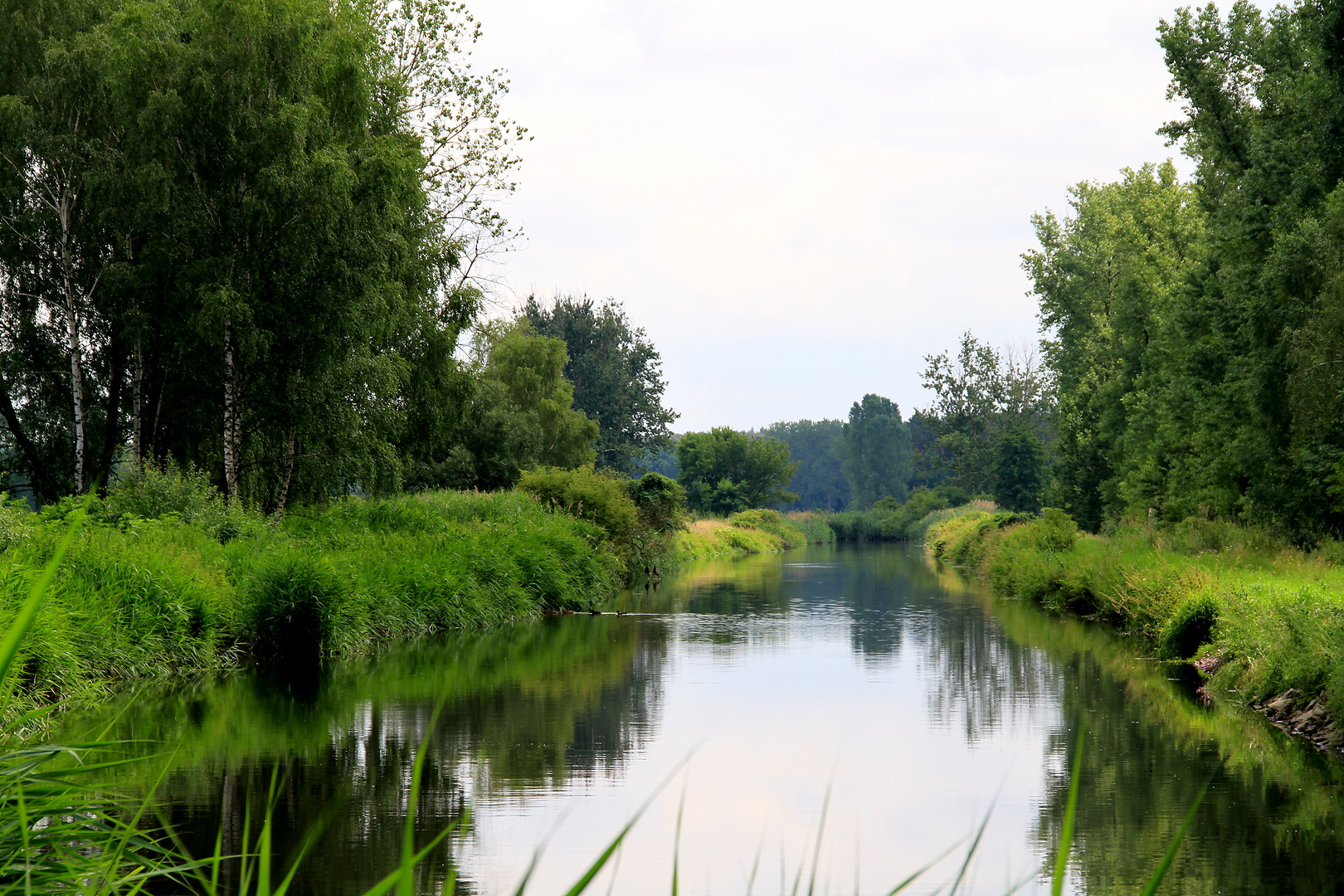
- Ner river near Puczniewo

Location
- Country: Poland

Physical characteristics
- Mouth
  - location: Warta
  - coordinates: 52.1413°N 18.6888°E
- Length: 134 km (83 mi)

Basin features
- Progression: Warta→ Oder→ Baltic Sea

The Ner is a river in central Poland approximately 134 km (83 mi) long, with sources to the south-east of Łódź. Running through the Łódzkie and Wielkopolskie voivodeships (provinces), it is a right tributary of the Warta River (the third largest river in Poland), and the largest river in Łódź.
