= Grünbach =

Grünbach may refer to:

- Grünbach, Saxony, a municipality in the Vogtlandkreis, Saxony, Germany
- Grünbach, Upper Austria, a municipality in the district of Freistadt, Upper Austria, Austria
- Grünbach am Schneeberg, a town in the district of Neunkirchen, Lower Austria, Austria
- Grünbach (Tauber), a river of Baden-Württemberg, Germany
- Korzecznik-Szatanowo, German name Grünbach, a village in the administrative district of Gmina Babiak, within Koło County, in west-central Poland
- Grünbach Formation, a geological formation in Austria
