= Suchy Las, Koło County =

Suchy Las
- Village
- Location within Poland
- Coordinates: 52°18′42″N 18°41′34″E
- Country: Poland
- Voivodeship: Greater Poland
- County: Koło
- Gmina: Babiak

Population (2006)
  - Total: 70
- Time zone: UTC+1 (CET)
  - Summer (DST): UTC+2 (CEST)
- Postal code: 62-620
- Area code: (+48) 63
- Vehicle registration: PKL

Suchy Las [ˈsuxɨ ˈlas] is a village in the administrative district of Gmina Babiak, within Koło County, Greater Poland Voivodeship, in central Poland.
