= Głogowa, Koło County =

Głogowa
- Village
- Location within Poland
- Coordinates: 52°16′26″N 18°56′44″E
- Country: Poland
- Voivodeship: Greater Poland
- County: Koło
- Gmina: Kłodawa
- Time zone: UTC+1 (CET)
  - Summer (DST): UTC+2 (CEST)
- Vehicle registration: PKL

Głogowa [ɡwɔˈɡɔva] is a village in the administrative district of Gmina Kłodawa, within Koło County, Greater Poland Voivodeship, in central Poland.
