= Górki, Koło County =

Górki
- Village
- Location within Poland
- Coordinates: 52°14′N 18°53′E
- Country: Poland
- Voivodeship: Greater Poland
- County: Koło
- Gmina: Kłodawa
- Time zone: UTC+1 (CET)
  - Summer (DST): UTC+2 (CEST)
- Vehicle registration: PKL

Górki [ˈɡurki] is a village in the administrative district of Gmina Kłodawa, within Koło County, Greater Poland Voivodeship, in central Poland.
