= Krzykosy, Gmina Kłodawa =

Krzykosy
- Village
- Location within Poland
- Coordinates: 52°15′34″N 18°49′57″E
- Country: Poland
- Voivodeship: Greater Poland
- County: Koło
- Gmina: Kłodawa
- Time zone: UTC+1 (CET)
  - Summer (DST): UTC+2 (CEST)
- Vehicle registration: PKL

Krzykosy [kʂɨˈkɔsɨ] is a village in the administrative district of Gmina Kłodawa, within Koło County, Greater Poland Voivodeship, in central Poland.
