= Leszcze, Gmina Kłodawa =

Leszcze
- Village
- Location within Poland
- Coordinates: 52°18′25″N 18°52′24″E
- Country: Poland
- Voivodeship: Greater Poland
- County: Koło
- Gmina: Kłodawa
- Time zone: UTC+1 (CET)
  - Summer (DST): UTC+2 (CEST)
- Vehicle registration: PKL

Leszcze [ˈlɛʂt͡ʂɛ] is a village in the administrative district of Gmina Kłodawa, within Koło County, Greater Poland Voivodeship, in central Poland.
