= Sebastian Sierakowski =

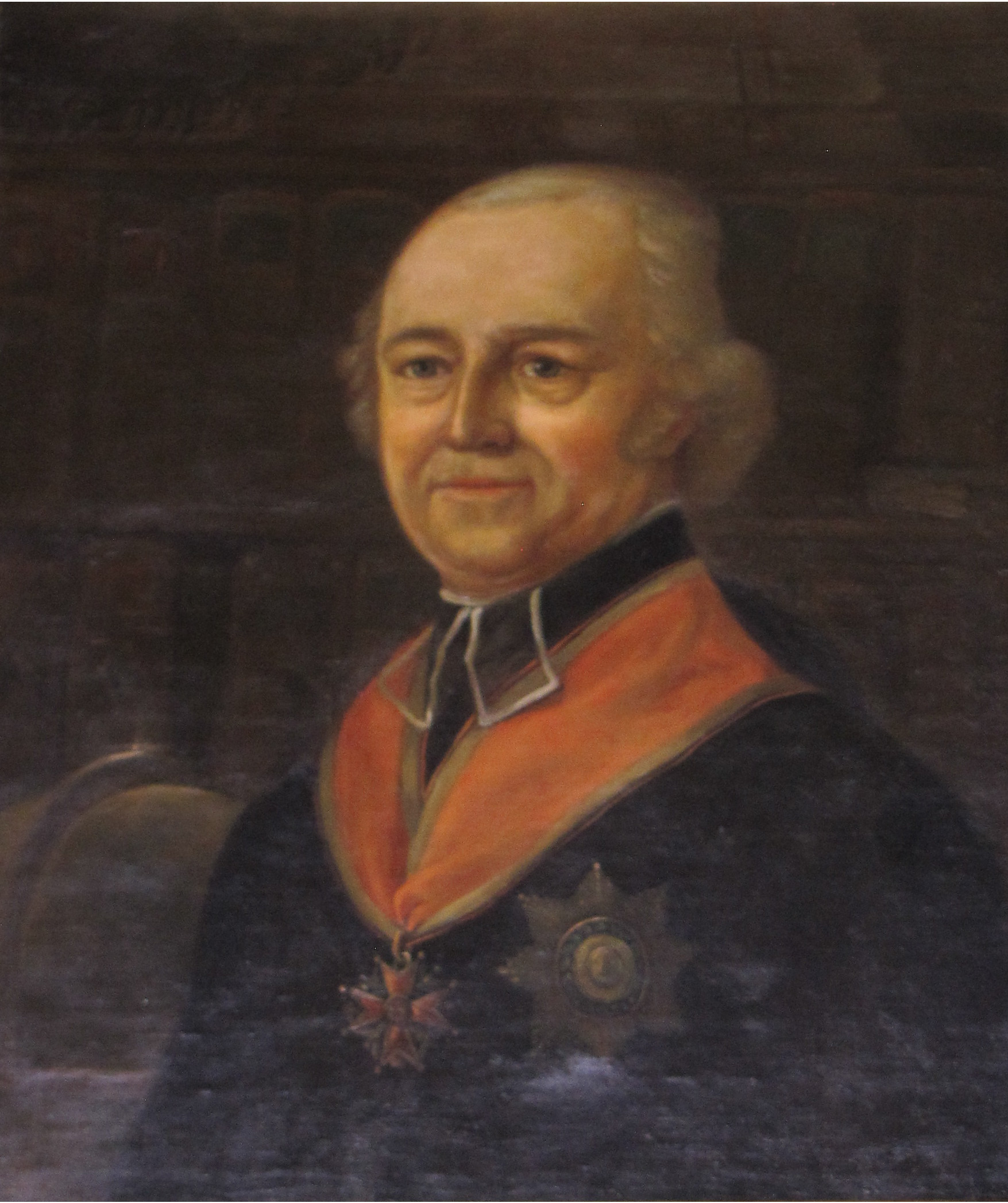
Sebastian Sierakowski (date and artist unknown)

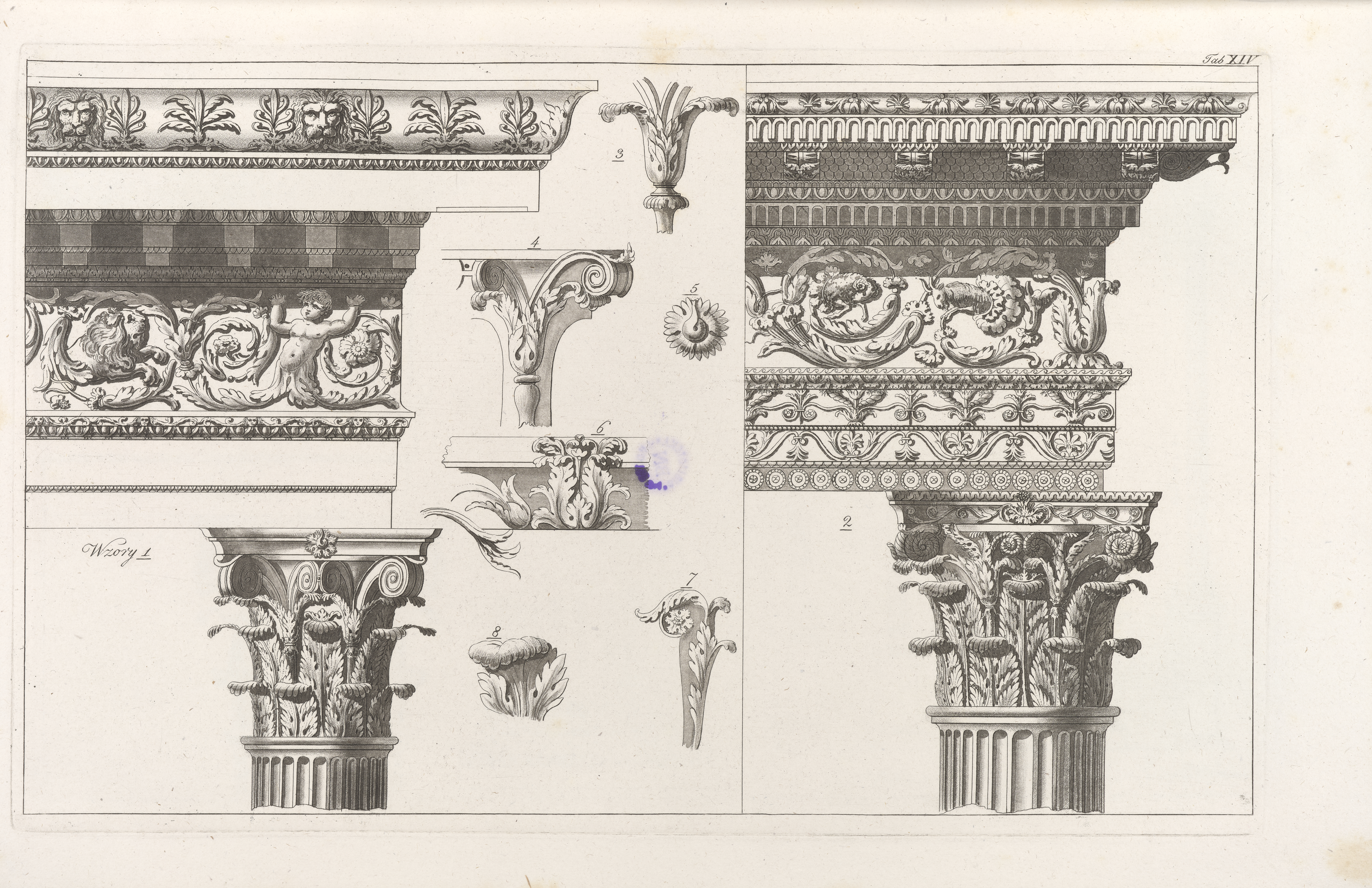
Illustration from his book on architecture, vol. 2

Sebastian Alojzy Sierakowski (9 January 1743 – 9 August 1824) was a Polish architect and Jesuit pastor.

== Biography ==
Sierakowski was born on 9 January 1743 in Bogusławice. His uncle, Wacław Hieronim Sierakowski, was the Bishop of Przemyśl. He studied at the Jesuit College of Jarosław and, in 1759, became a novice in Ostróg. From 1764 to 1767, he studied mathematics and theology in Lwów, then continued his theological studies in Vienna and Rome, where he was ordained in 1768. Upon returning to Poland, he served as a professor of mathematics and astronomy at the Jesuit College of Lwów. In 1771, he helped establish the Astronomical Observatory of Lwów University, and served as its first director.

When the Jesuit Order was suppressed in 1773, he went to Kraków; becoming a Canon at Wawel Cathedral. On the occasion of the arrival of Stanisław August Poniatowski in 1787, he created a restoration plan for Wawel Castle. Later, he served as Crown Custodian, then as a Senator for the Free City of Kraków. After 1790, he was a clergyman with the Civil-Military Order Commission.

In 1806, the Church of St. Vincent and the Nativity of the Blessed Virgin Mary, where he was to preside, was built according to his plans. From 1809 to 1814, he served as Rector at the Jagiellonian University. He became a member of the General Confederation of the Kingdom of Poland in 1812. This was followed by designs for reconstructing the decaying Kraków Cloth Hall (1818), and the demolished Kraków Town Hall (1820). Also in 1818, he presented the Governing Senate with several plans for monumental fountains decorated with patriotic sculptures, that could serve as wells; replacing the old wooden water tanks. These plans were never carried out, due to a lack of funds. Some of his monumental designs were used to create a colonnade in the chancel at the Church of St. Augustine and St. John the Baptist.

He died on 9 August 1824 in Kraków. Two of his writings survive: Architektura obejmująca wszelki gatunek murowania i budowania ("Architecture, covering all kinds of bricklaying and building", 2 Vols. 1812), which addresses the folk architecture tradition; and Rzecz o tanim... sposobie murowania w Krakowie domów na przedmieściach ("A thing about a cheap ... way of building houses in the suburbs in Kraków", 1817), which is still in manuscript.
