= Maliniec =

Maliniec may refer to the following places:

- Maliniec, Greater Poland Voivodeship (central Poland)
- Maliniec, Lublin Voivodeship (east Poland)
- Maliniec, West Pomeranian Voivodeship (north-west Poland)
