= Rysiny, Koło County =

Rysiny
- Village
- Location within Poland
- Coordinates: 52°18′28″N 18°47′22″E
- Country: Poland
- Voivodeship: Greater Poland
- County: Koło
- Gmina: Kłodawa
- Population (approx.): 130
- Time zone: UTC+1 (CET)
  - Summer (DST): UTC+2 (CEST)
- Vehicle registration: PKL

Rysiny [rɨˈɕinɨ] is a village in the administrative district of Gmina Kłodawa, within Koło County, Greater Poland Voivodeship, in central Poland.

The village has an approximate population of 130.
