= Nowa Wieś, Koło County =

Nowa Wieś
- Village
- Location within Poland
- Coordinates: 52°15′1″N 18°33′25″E
- Country: Poland
- Voivodeship: Greater Poland
- County: Koło
- Gmina: Osiek Mały
- Population: 120
- Time zone: UTC+1 (CET)
  - Summer (DST): UTC+2 (CEST)
- Vehicle registration: PKL

Nowa Wieś [ˈnɔva ˈvjɛɕ] is a village in the administrative district of Gmina Osiek Mały, within Koło County, Greater Poland Voivodeship, in central Poland.
