= Józefowo, Gmina Babiak =

Józefowo
- Village
- Location within Poland
- Coordinates: 52°22′1″N 18°40′5″E
- Country: Poland
- Voivodeship: Greater Poland
- County: Koło
- Gmina: Babiak

Population
  - Total: 60
- Time zone: UTC+1 (CET)
  - Summer (DST): UTC+2 (CEST)
- Vehicle registration: PKL

Józefowo (Polish: [juzɛˈfɔvɔ]; German: 1943–45 Josefsberg) is a village in the administrative district of Gmina Babiak, within Koło County, Greater Poland Voivodeship, in central Poland.
