= Stare Morzyce =

- Village
- Location within Poland
- Coordinates: 52°24′53″N 18°37′25″E
- Country: Poland
- Voivodeship: Greater Poland
- County: Koło
- Gmina: Babiak
- Time zone: UTC+1 (CET)
  - Summer (DST): UTC+2 (CEST)
- Vehicle registration: PKL

Stare Morzyce [ˈstarɛ mɔˈʐɨt͡sɛ] is a village in the administrative district of Gmina Babiak, within Koło County, Greater Poland Voivodeship, in central Poland.
