= Mchowo, Greater Poland Voivodeship =

Mchowo
- Village
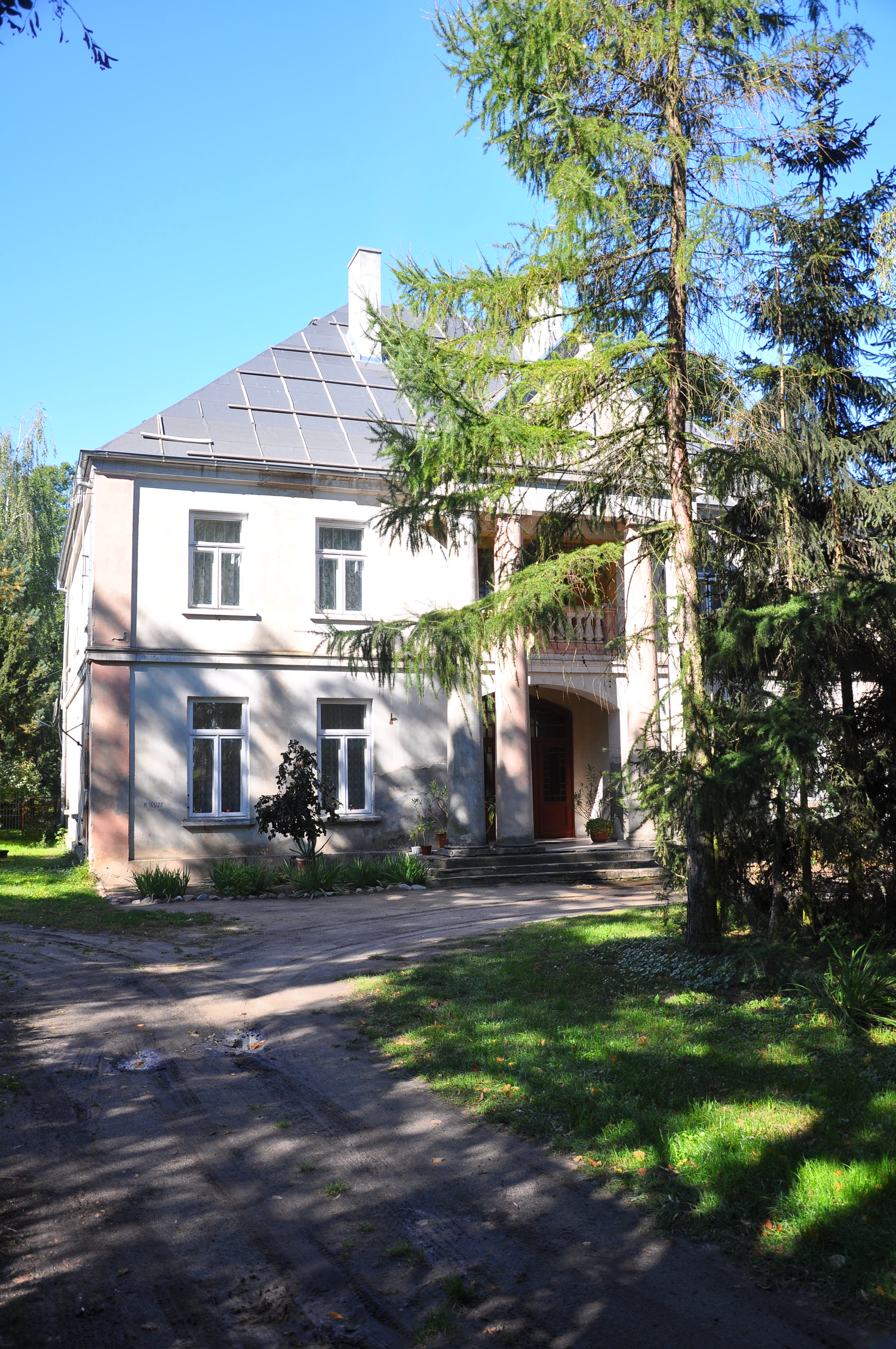
- Manor in Mchowo

- Location within Poland
- Coordinates: 52°23′N 18°42′E
- Country: Poland
- Voivodeship: (Greater Poland Voivodeship) Greater Poland
- County: Koło
- Gmina: Babiak
- Time zone: UTC+1 (CET)
  - Summer (DST): UTC+2 (CEST)
- Vehicle registration: PKL

Mchowo [ˈmxɔvɔ] is a village in the administrative district of Gmina Babiak, within Koło County, Greater Poland Voivodeship, in central Poland.
