= Pomarzany Fabryczne =

- Village
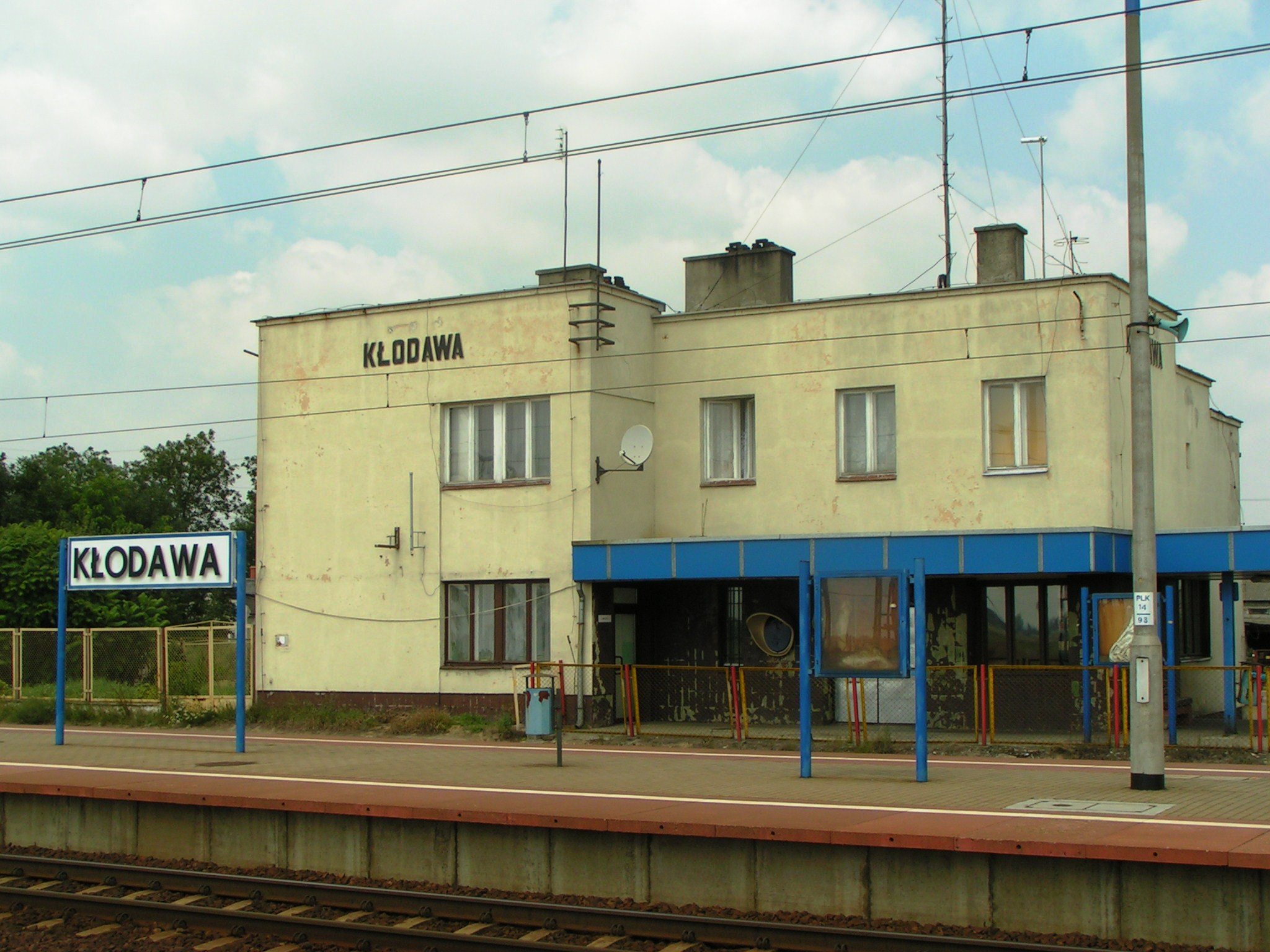

- Location within Poland
- Coordinates: 52°14′19″N 18°53′02″E
- Country: Poland
- Voivodeship: Greater Poland
- County: Koło
- Gmina: Kłodawa
- Time zone: UTC+1 (CET)
  - Summer (DST): UTC+2 (CEST)
- Vehicle registration: PKL
- Website: http://pomarzanyfabryczne.eu

Pomarzany Fabryczne [pɔmaˈʐanɨ faˈbrɨt͡ʂnɛ] is a village in the administrative district of Gmina Kłodawa, within Koło County, Greater Poland Voivodeship, in central Poland.

== History ==
Four Polish citizens were murdered by Nazi Germany in the village during World War II.
