= Żurawieniec =

Żurawieniec may refer to the following places:

- Żurawieniec, Greater Poland Voivodeship (central Poland)
- Żurawieniec, Kutno County in Łódź Voivodeship (central Poland)
- Żurawieniec, Pabianice County in Łódź Voivodeship (central Poland)
