= Osiek Mały-Kolonia =

- Village
- Location within Poland
- Coordinates: 52°16′13″N 18°35′42″E
- Country: Poland
- Voivodeship: Greater Poland
- County: Koło
- Gmina: Osiek Mały
- Time zone: UTC+1 (CET)
  - Summer (DST): UTC+2 (CEST)
- Vehicle registration: PKL

Osiek Mały-Kolonia [ˈɔɕɛk ˈmawɨ kɔˈlɔɲa] is a village in the administrative district of Gmina Osiek Mały, within Koło County, Greater Poland Voivodeship, in central Poland.
