= Stare Budki =

- Village
- Location within Poland
- Coordinates: 52°14′18″N 18°32′32″E
- Country: Poland
- Voivodeship: Greater Poland
- County: Koło
- Gmina: Osiek Mały
- Time zone: UTC+1 (CET)
  - Summer (DST): UTC+2 (CEST)
- Vehicle registration: PKL

Stare Budki [ˈstarɛ ˈbutki] is a village in the administrative district of Gmina Osiek Mały, within Koło County, Greater Poland Voivodeship, in central Poland.
