= Olszak =

Olszak may refer to:

== Places ==
- Olszak, Greater Poland Voivodeship (central Poland)
- Olszak, Masovian Voivodeship (east-central Poland)
- Olszak, West Pomeranian Voivodeship (north-west Poland)

== People with the surname ==
- Grzegorz Olszak (1969–), Polish diplomat
- Wacław Olszak (1868–1939), Polish physician and politician

== See also ==
- Olschak
