= Wólka Czepowa =

- Village
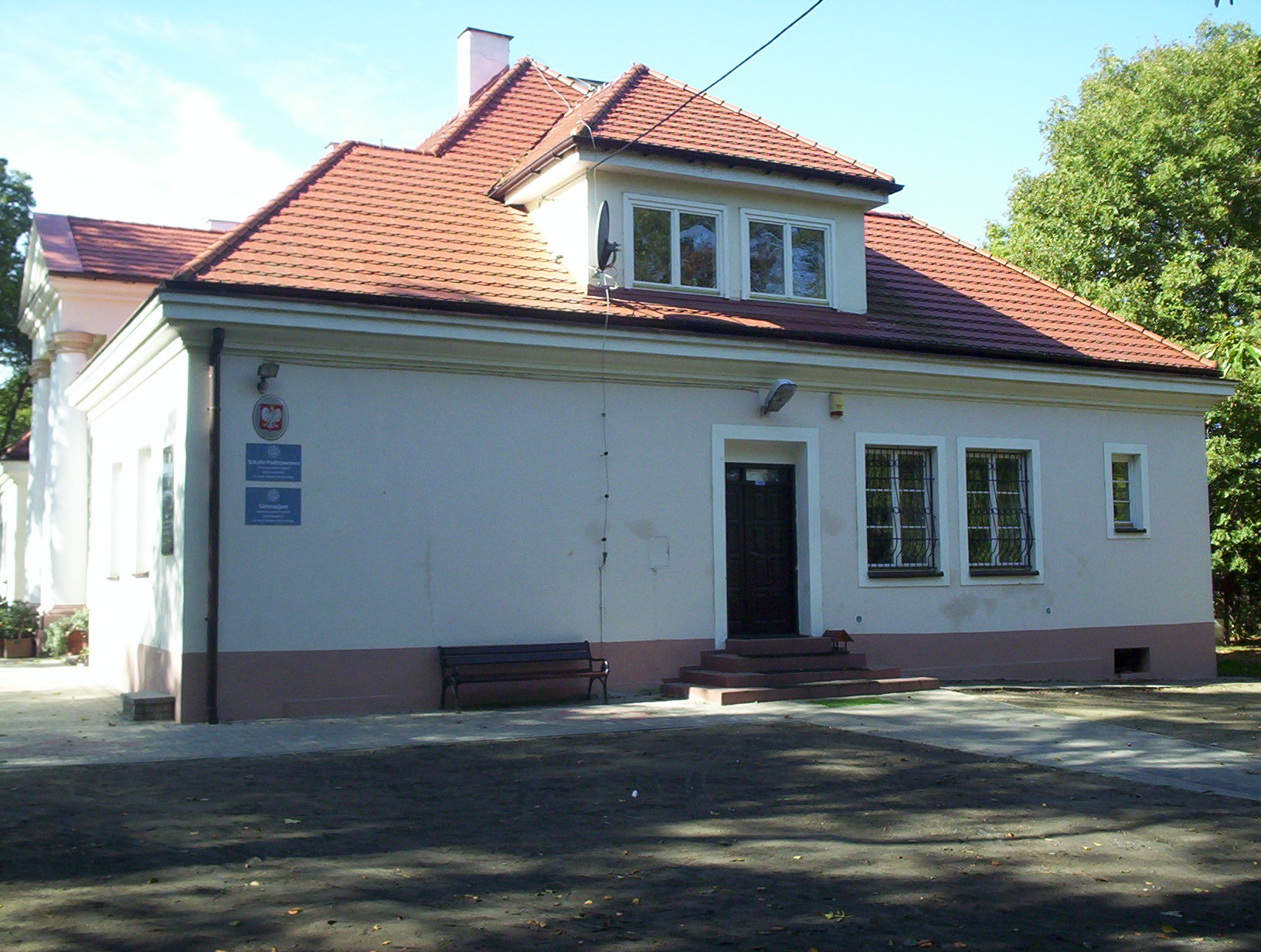
- Manor in Wólka Czepowa

- Location within Poland
- Coordinates: 52°14′N 18°56′E
- Country: Poland
- Voivodeship: Greater Poland
- County: Koło
- Gmina: Kłodawa
- Time zone: UTC+1 (CET)
  - Summer (DST): UTC+2 (CEST)
- Vehicle registration: PKL

Wólka Czepowa [ˈvulka t͡ʂɛˈpɔva] is a village in the administrative district of Gmina Kłodawa, within Koło County, Greater Poland Voivodeship, in central Poland.
