= Zwierzchociny =

- Village
- Location within Poland
- Coordinates: 52°17′12″N 18°43′11″E
- Country: Poland
- Voivodeship: Greater Poland
- County: Koło
- Gmina: Babiak
- Time zone: UTC+1 (CET)
  - Summer (DST): UTC+2 (CEST)
- Vehicle registration: PKL

Zwierzchociny [zvjɛʂxɔˈt͡ɕinɨ] is a village in the administrative district of Gmina Babiak, within Koło County, Greater Poland Voivodeship, in central Poland. It is bordered to the west by Sokołowo and Podkiejsze, the north by Kiejsze and Osówie, the east by Lipie Góry and by Kiełczew Smużny Czwarty in the south.
