= Lipie Góry, Greater Poland Voivodeship =

Lipie Góry
- Village
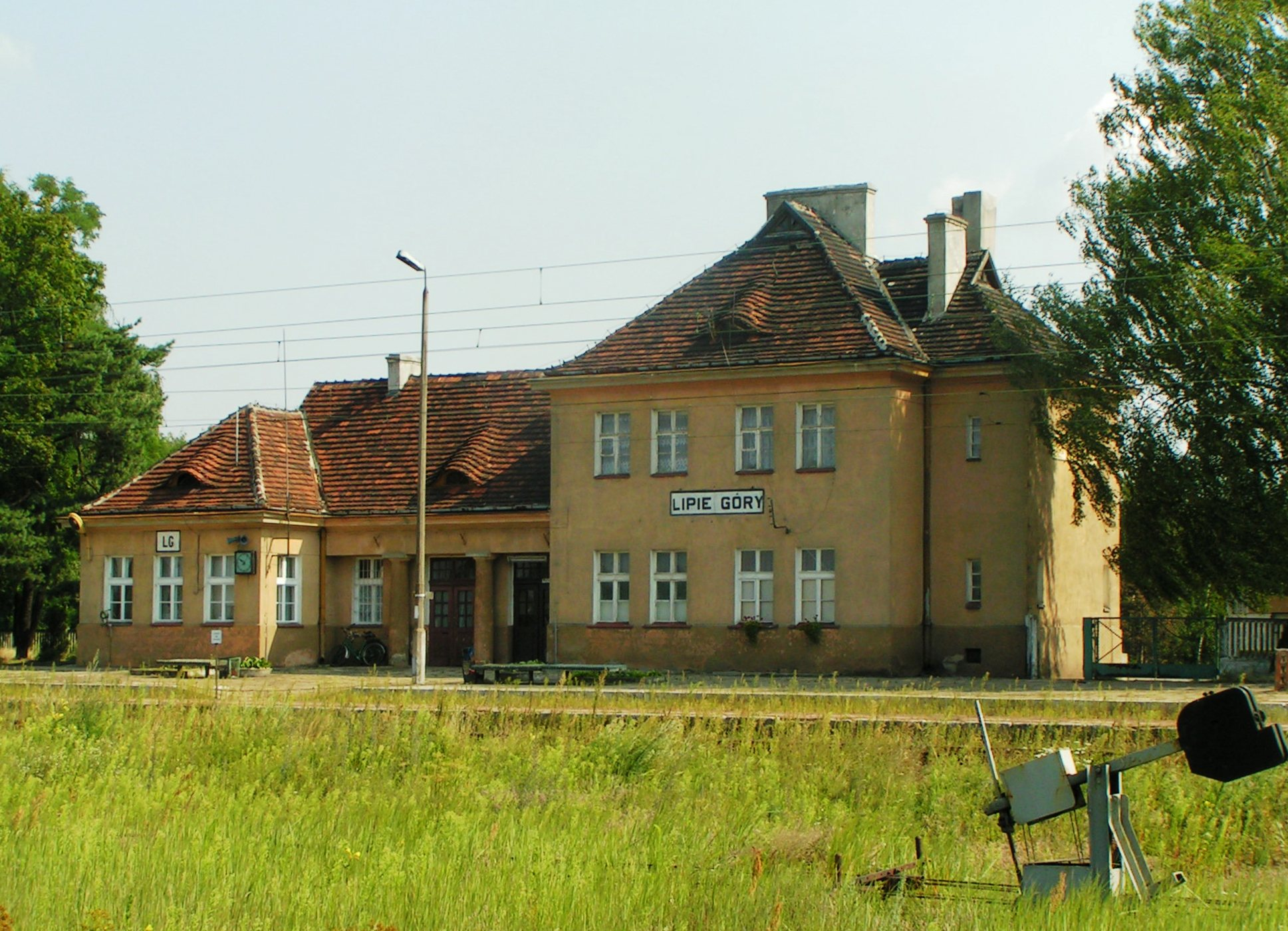
- Railway station in Lipie Góry

- Location within Poland
- Coordinates: 52°18′N 18°42′E
- Country: Poland
- Voivodeship: Greater Poland
- County: Koło
- Gmina: Babiak

Population
  - Total: 70
- Time zone: UTC+1 (CET)
  - Summer (DST): UTC+2 (CEST)
- Vehicle registration: PKL

Lipie Góry [ˈlipjɛ ˈɡurɨ] is a village in the administrative district of Gmina Babiak, within Koło County, Greater Poland Voivodeship, in central Poland.
