= Bugajski =

Bugajski (feminine: Bugajska; plural: Bugajscy) is a Polish-language surname associated with any of locations named Bugaj. Notable people with this surname include:

- Adam Bugajski (born 1974), Polish civil servant
- Dariusz Bugajski (born 1970), Polish Navy officer, scholar and professor of public international maritime law
- Janusz Bugajski (1954–2025), American advisor
- Josh Bugajski (born 1990), British rower
- Ryszard Bugajski (1943–2019), Polish filmmaker

== See also ==
- Bugaj (surname)
