= Bierzwienna Długa =

- Village
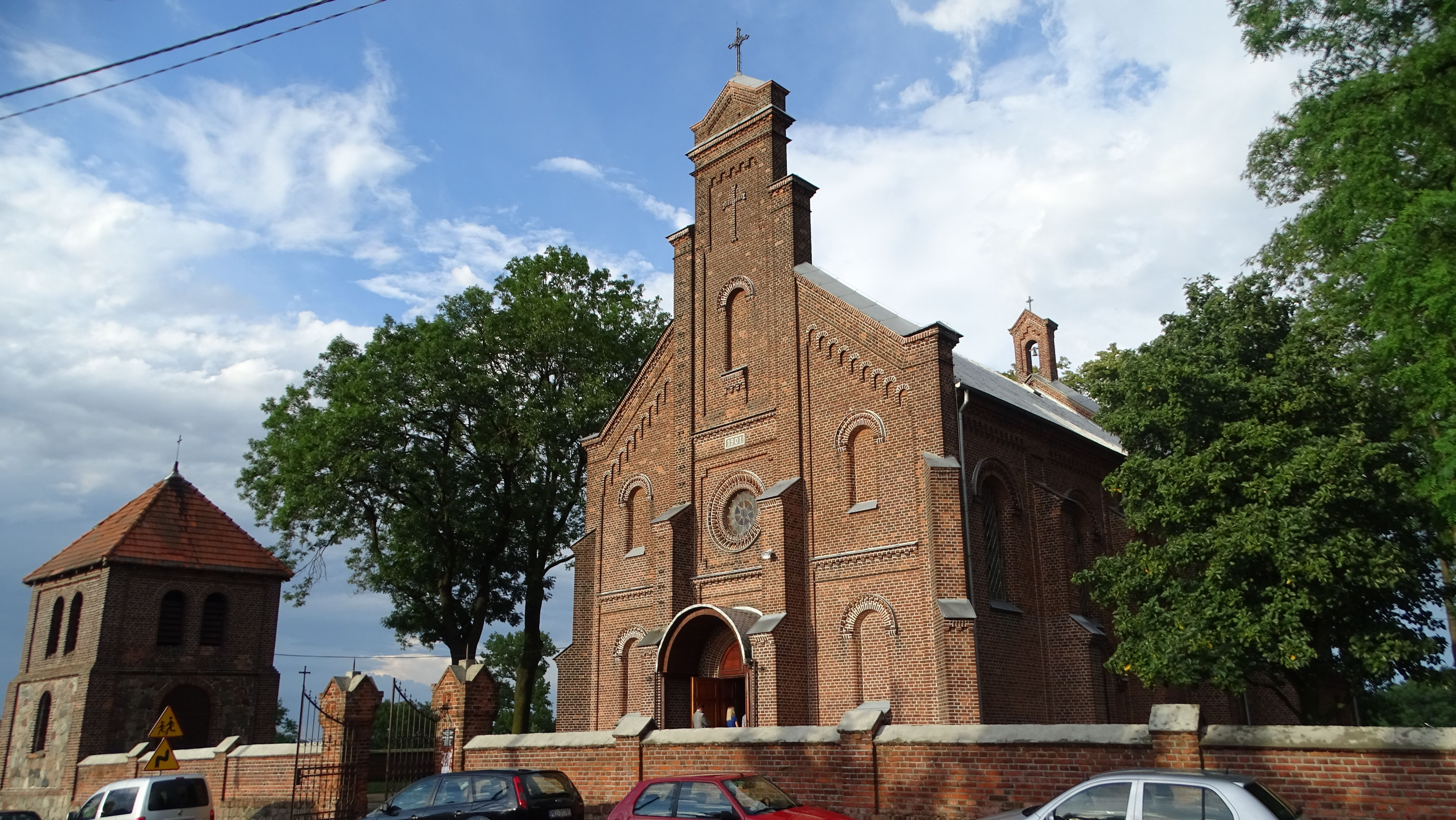
- Saint Dominic church in Bierzwienna Długa

- Location within Poland
- Coordinates: 52°17′N 18°54′E
- Country: Poland
- Voivodeship: Greater Poland
- County: Koło
- Gmina: Kłodawa

Population
  - Total: 350
- Time zone: UTC+1 (CET)
  - Summer (DST): UTC+2 (CEST)
- Vehicle registration: PKL

Bierzwienna Długa [bjɛʐˈvjɛnna ˈdwuɡa] is a village in the administrative district of Gmina Kłodawa, within Koło County, Greater Poland Voivodeship, in central Poland.
