= Krukowo =

Krukowo may refer to the following places:

- Krukowo, Greater Poland Voivodeship (west-central Poland)
- Krukowo, Kuyavian-Pomeranian Voivodeship (north-central Poland)
- Krukowo, Masovian Voivodeship (east-central Poland)
