= Witowo =

Witowo may refer to the following places:

- Witowo, Koło County in Greater Poland Voivodeship (central Poland)
- Witowo, Gmina Krzykosy, Środa County in Greater Poland Voivodeship (west-central Poland)
- Witowo, Kuyavian-Pomeranian Voivodeship (central Poland)
- Witowo, Podlaskie Voivodeship (east Poland)
- Witowo, Warmian-Masurian Voivodeship (north Poland)
