= Stefanowski =

Stefanowski, feminine: Stefanowska is a Polish surname. Most commonly derived from any of the places named Stefanowo, occasionally from the given name Stefan. Variants include Stefanoski, Steffanowski, Stefanowsky. Notable persons with the surname include:

- Bob Stefanowski (born 1962), American politician
- Bohdan Stefanowski, Polish scientist
- Jack Stefanowski, Polish-American soccer player and coach
- Michalina Stefanowska, Polish biologist
