= Radoszewice, Greater Poland Voivodeship =

Radoszewice
- Village
- Location within Poland
- Coordinates: 52°22′17″N 18°43′10″E
- Country: Poland
- Voivodeship: Greater Poland
- County: Koło
- Gmina: Babiak
- Time zone: UTC+1 (CET)
  - Summer (DST): UTC+2 (CEST)
- Vehicle registration: PKL

Radoszewice [radɔʂɛˈvit͡sɛ] is a village in the administrative district of Gmina Babiak, within Koło County, Greater Poland Voivodeship, in central Poland.
