= Polonisz =

- Village
- Location within Poland
- Coordinates: 52°21′N 18°42′E
- Country: Poland
- Voivodeship: Greater Poland
- County: Koło
- Gmina: Babiak
- Time zone: UTC+1 (CET)
  - Summer (DST): UTC+2 (CEST)
- Vehicle registration: PKL

Polonisz [pɔˈlɔniʂ] is a village in the administrative district of Gmina Babiak, within Koło County, Greater Poland Voivodeship, in central Poland.

== Notable people ==
- Stefania Sempołowska, teacher and educational activist, campaigner for children's rights, journalist and writer.
