= Cząstków, Koło County =

Cząstków
- Village
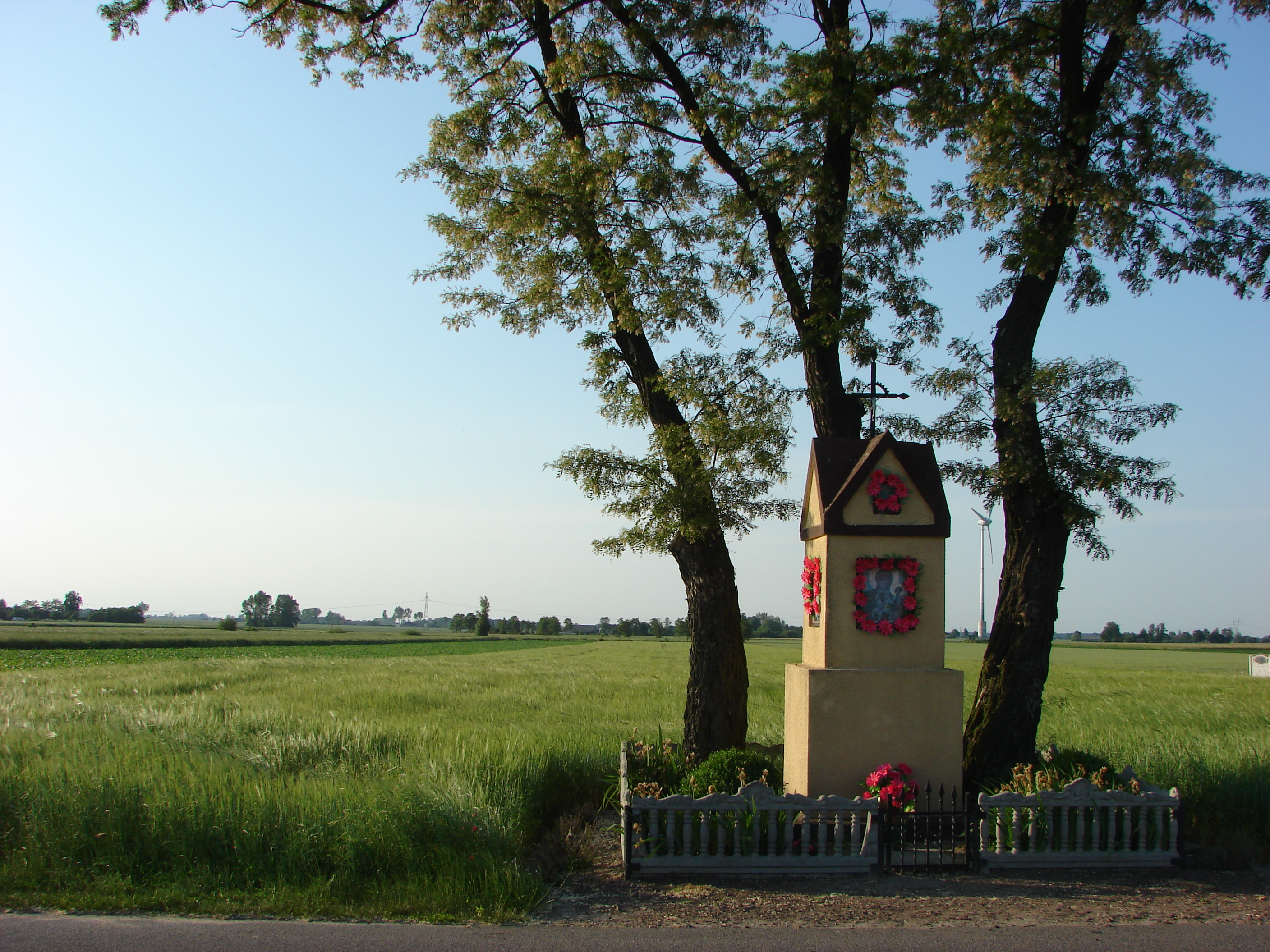
- Wayside shrine

- Location within Poland
- Coordinates: 52°16′N 18°52′E
- Country: Poland
- Voivodeship: Greater Poland
- County: Koło
- Gmina: Kłodawa
- Population: 450
- Time zone: UTC+1 (CET)
  - Summer (DST): UTC+2 (CEST)
- Vehicle registration: PKL

Cząstków [ˈt͡ʂɔ̃stkuf] is a village in the administrative district of Gmina Kłodawa, within Koło County, Greater Poland Voivodeship, in central Poland.
