= Łążek, Greater Poland Voivodeship =

Łążek
- Village
- Location within Poland
- Coordinates: 52°15′30″N 18°56′40″E
- Country: Poland
- Voivodeship: Greater Poland
- County: Koło
- Gmina: Kłodawa
- Time zone: UTC+1 (CET)
  - Summer (DST): UTC+2 (CEST)
- Vehicle registration: PKL

Łążek [ˈwɔ̃ʐɛk] is a village in the administrative district of Gmina Kłodawa, within Koło County, Greater Poland Voivodeship, in central Poland.
