= Lubotyń, Greater Poland Voivodeship =

Lubotyń
- Village
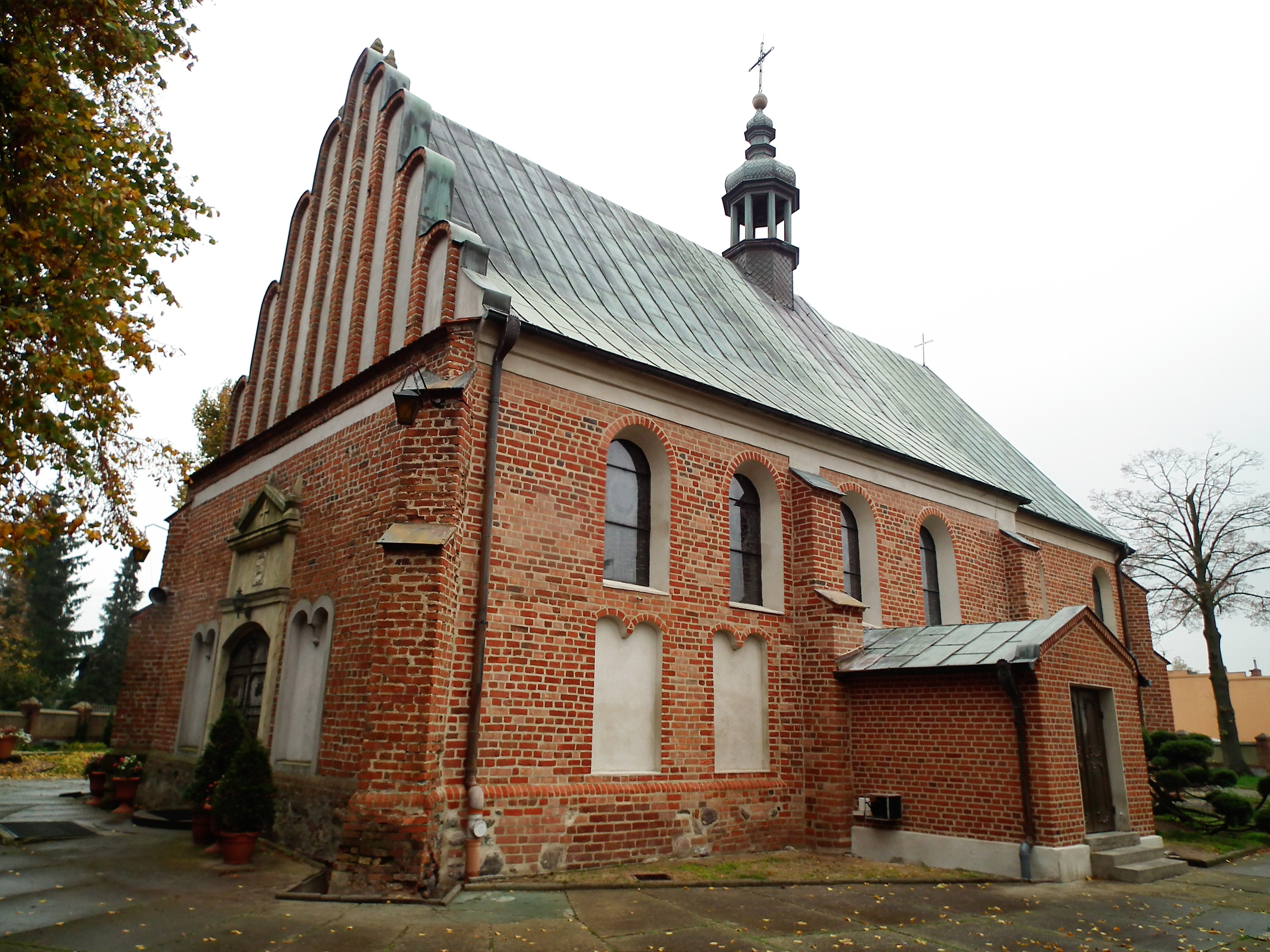
- Church of St. Lawrence in Lubotyń

- Location within Poland
- Coordinates: 52°23′38″N 18°37′45″E
- Country: Poland
- Voivodeship: Greater Poland
- County: Koło
- Gmina: Babiak
- Elevation: 103 m (338 ft)

Population
  - Total: 220
- Time zone: UTC+1 (CET)
  - Summer (DST): UTC+2 (CEST)
- Vehicle registration: PKL

Lubotyń [luˈbɔtɨɲ] is a village in the administrative district of Gmina Babiak, within Koło County, Greater Poland Voivodeship, in central Poland.
