= Witowo, Koło County =

Witowo
- Village
- Location within Poland
- Coordinates: 52°16′3″N 18°33′58″E
- Country: Poland
- Voivodeship: Greater Poland
- County: Koło
- Gmina: Osiek Mały
- Time zone: UTC+1 (CET)
  - Summer (DST): UTC+2 (CEST)
- Vehicle registration: PKL

Witowo [viˈtɔvɔ] is a village in the administrative district of Gmina Osiek Mały, within Koło County, Greater Poland Voivodeship, in central Poland.
