= Osiek Mały, Greater Poland Voivodeship =

Osiek Mały
- Village
- Location within Poland
- Coordinates: 52°17′0″N 18°35′0″E
- Country: Poland
- Voivodeship: Greater Poland
- County: Koło
- Gmina: Osiek Mały
- Population: 480
- Time zone: UTC+1 (CET)
  - Summer (DST): UTC+2 (CEST)
- Vehicle registration: PKL

Osiek Mały [ˈɔɕɛk ˈmawɨ] is a village in Koło County, Greater Poland Voivodeship, in central Poland. It is the seat of the gmina (administrative district) called Gmina Osiek Mały.
