= Bugaj (surname) =

- Artur Bugaj (born 1970), Polish football player
- Krzysztof Kamil Baczyński, nom de guerre: Jan Bugaj
- Tomasz Bugaj (born 1950) Polish orchestra conductor and music educator
- Roman Bugaj (born 1973), Polish heavyweight boxer
- Ryszard Bugaj (born 1944), Polish economist and politician, MP

== See also ==
- Bugajski
