= Bugaj =

Bugaj may refer to the following places:

- Bugaj, Gorlice County in Lesser Poland Voivodeship (south Poland)
- Bugaj, Pajęczno County in Łódź Voivodeship (central Poland)
- Bugaj, Radomsko County in Łódź Voivodeship (central Poland)
- Bugaj, Wadowice County in Lesser Poland Voivodeship (south Poland)
- Bugaj, Busko County in Świętokrzyskie Voivodeship (south Poland)
- Bugaj, Jędrzejów County in Świętokrzyskie Voivodeship (south-central Poland)
- Bugaj, Kielce County in Świętokrzyskie Voivodeship (south-central Poland)
- Bugaj, Pińczów County in Świętokrzyskie Voivodeship (south Poland)
- Bugaj, Sandomierz County in Świętokrzyskie Voivodeship (south-central Poland)
- Bugaj, Skarżysko County in Świętokrzyskie Voivodeship (south-central Poland)
- Bugaj, Chodzież County in Greater Poland Voivodeship (west-central Poland)
- Bugaj, Koło County in Greater Poland Voivodeship (central Poland)
- Bugaj, Kalisz County in Greater Poland Voivodeship (central Poland)
- Bugaj, Gmina Raszków, Ostrów County in Greater Poland Voivodeship (west-central Poland)
- Bugaj, Gmina Kleszczewo in Greater Poland Voivodeship (west-central Poland)
- Bugaj, Gmina Pobiedziska in Greater Poland Voivodeship (west-central Poland)
- Bugaj, Szamotuły County in Greater Poland Voivodeship (west-central Poland)
- Bugaj, Września County in Greater Poland Voivodeship (west-central Poland)
- Bugaj, Opole Voivodeship (south Poland)
