= Stefanowo, Koło County =

Stefanowo
- Village
- Location within Poland
- Coordinates: 52°20′24″N 18°40′53″E
- Country: Poland
- Voivodeship: Greater Poland
- County: Koło
- Gmina: Babiak
- Time zone: UTC+1 (CET)
  - Summer (DST): UTC+2 (CEST)
- Vehicle registration: PKL

Stefanowo [stɛfaˈnɔvɔ] is a village in the administrative district of Gmina Babiak, within Koło County, Greater Poland Voivodeship, in central Poland.
