= Korzecznik-Szatanowo =

- Village
- Location within Poland
- Coordinates: 52°20′15″N 18°47′03″E
- Country: Poland
- Voivodeship: Greater Poland
- County: Koło
- Gmina: Babiak
- Time zone: UTC+1 (CET)
  - Summer (DST): UTC+2 (CEST)
- Vehicle registration: PKL

Korzecznik-Szatanowo [kɔˈʐɛt͡ʂnik ʂataˈnɔvɔ] is a village in the administrative district of Gmina Babiak, within Koło County, Greater Poland Voivodeship, in central Poland.
