= Gmina Osiek Mały =

Gmina Osiek Mały Osiek Mały Commune
- Gmina
- Coordinates (Osiek Mały): 52°17′N 18°35′E
- Country: Poland
- Voivodeship: Greater Poland
- County: Koło
- Seat: Osiek Mały

Area
  - Total: 87.33 km^{2} (33.72 sq mi)

Population (2006)
  - Total: 5,866
  - Density: 67.17/km^{2} (174.0/sq mi)
- Time zone: UTC+1 (CET)
  - Summer (DST): UTC+2 (CEST)
- Vehicle registration: PKL

Gmina Osiek Mały is a rural gmina (administrative district) in Koło County, Greater Poland Voivodeship, in central Poland. Its seat is the village of Osiek Mały, which lies approximately 10 kilometres (6 mi) north of Koło and 115 km (71 mi) east of the regional capital Poznań.

The gmina covers an area of 87.33 square kilometres (33.7 sq mi), and as of 2006 its total population is 5,866.

== Villages ==
Gmina Osiek Mały contains the villages and settlements of Borecznia Wielka, Dęby Szlacheckie, Drzewce, Felicjanów, Grądy, Lipiny, Łuczywno, Maciejewo, Młynek, Moczydła, Nowa Wieś, Nowe Budki, Nowy Budzisław, Osiek Mały, Osiek Mały-Kolonia, Osiek Wielki, Rosocha, Smólniki Osieckie, Smólniki Racięckie, Stare Budki, Stary Budzisław, Szarłatów, Trzebuchów, Witowo and Zielenie.

== Neighbouring gminas ==
Gmina Osiek Mały is bordered by the town of Koło and by the gminas of Babiak, Koło, Kramsk and Sompolno.
