= Stefania Sempołowska =

Polish educator, activist and writer

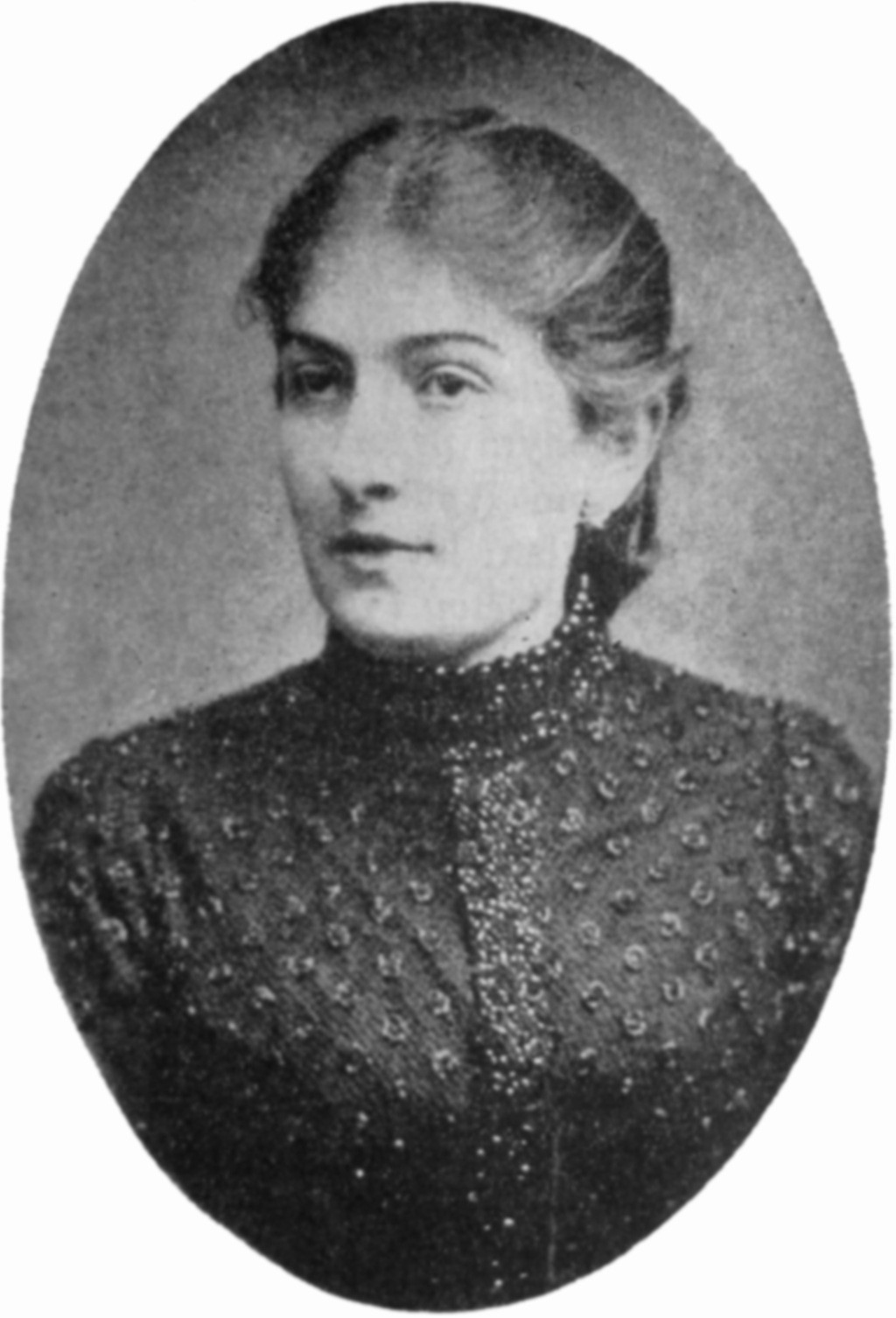
- Stefania Sempołowska
- Born: 1 October 1869; Polonisz, Poland
- Died: 31 January 1944 (aged 74); Warsaw, Poland
- Occupations: Educator, activist

Stefania Sempołowska (1 October 1869 – 31 January 1944) was a Polish educator, activist and writer.

She has been described as the leader of the movement for prisoners' rights in Poland during most of her lifetime.

== Biography ==
Sempołowska was born on 1 October 1869 in the village of Polonisz, Poznań Voivodeship (now Greater Poland Voivodeship). At age 17 she passed the Teacher Patent at the Government Commission in Warsaw. Since then she was a teacher, supporter of education, kids' rights activist, journalist, and writer – she wrote many school books. Between the World Wars, she became a publicist who fought for equal educational opportunities. She was a member of the Democratic Education Society "Nowe Tory" ("New Tracks"), co-editor of the teen magazine Z bliska i z daleka ("From Near and Far"), and later the biweekly for kids and educators W słońcu ("In the Sun"). She died on 31 January 1944 in Warsaw, and her funeral took place on 2 February.
