= Gmina Babiak =

Gmina Babiak Babiak Commune
- Gmina
- Coat of arms

- Coordinates (Babiak): 52°20′37″N 18°39′58″E
- Country: Poland
- Voivodeship: Greater Poland
- County: Koło
- Seat: Babiak

Area
  - Total: 133.58 km^{2} (51.58 sq mi)

Population (2006)
  - Total: 7,920
  - Density: 59.3/km^{2} (154/sq mi)
- Time zone: UTC+1 (CET)
  - Summer (DST): UTC+2 (CEST)
- Vehicle registration: PKL
- Website: http://www.babiak.org.pl

Gmina Babiak is a rural gmina (administrative district) in Koło County, Greater Poland Voivodeship, in central Poland. Its seat is the village of Babiak, which lies approximately 17 kilometres (11 mi) north of Koło and 120 km (75 mi) east of the regional capital Poznań.

The gmina covers an area of 133.58 square kilometres (51.6 sq mi), and as of 2006 its total population is 7,920.

== Villages ==
Gmina Babiak contains the villages and settlements of Babiak, Bogusławice, Bogusławice-Nowiny, Brdów, Brzezie, Bugaj, Dębno Królewskie, Dębno Poproboszczowskie, Góraj, Gryglaki, Janowice, Józefowo, Kiejsze, Korzecznik-Podlesie, Korzecznik-Szatanowo, Krukowo, Łaziska, Lichenek, Lipie Góry, Lubotyń, Maliniec, Mchowo, Nowiny Brdowskie, Olszak, Osówie, Ozorzyn, Podkiejsze, Polonisz, Psary, Radoszewice, Stare Morzyce, Stefanowo, Stypin, Suchy Las, Wiecinin, Zakrzewo, Żurawieniec, and Zwierzchociny.

== Neighbouring gminas ==
Gmina Babiak is bordered by the gminas of Grzegorzew, Izbica Kujawska, Kłodawa, Koło, Osiek Mały, Przedecz, Sompolno, Topólka, and Wierzbinek.
