= Bugaj, Koło County =

Bugaj
- Village
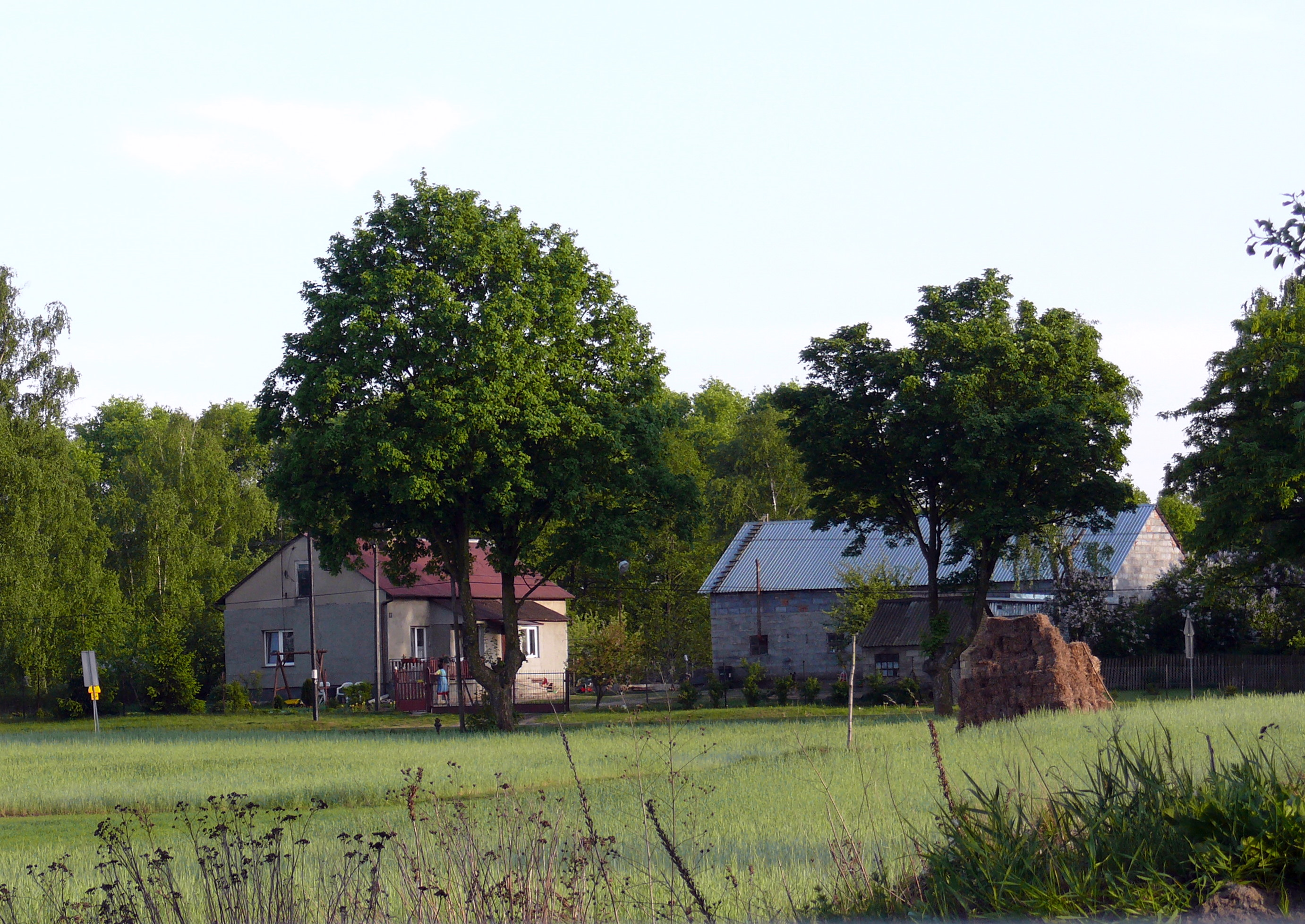
- Houses in Bugaj

- Location within Poland
- Coordinates: 52°20′N 18°43′E
- Country: Poland
- Voivodeship: Greater Poland
- County: Koło
- Gmina: Babiak
- Time zone: UTC+1 (CET)
  - Summer (DST): UTC+2 (CEST)
- Vehicle registration: PKL

Bugaj [ˈbuɡai̯] is a village in the administrative district of Gmina Babiak, within Koło County, Greater Poland Voivodeship, in central Poland.

== History ==
Three Polish citizens were murdered by Nazi Germany in the village during World War II.
