= Stefanowo =

Stefanowo may refer to the following places in Poland:

- Stefanowo, Gmina Kazimierz Biskupi in Greater Poland Voivodeship
- Stefanowo, Gmina Sompolno in Greater Poland Voivodeship
- Stefanowo, Gostyń County in Greater Poland Voivodeship
- Stefanowo, Koło County in Greater Poland Voivodeship
- Stefanowo, Nowy Tomyśl County in Greater Poland Voivodeship
- Stefanowo, Inowrocław County in Kuyavian-Pomeranian Voivodeship
- Stefanowo, Radziejów County in Kuyavian-Pomeranian Voivodeship
- Stefanowo, Włocławek County in Kuyavian-Pomeranian Voivodeship
- Stefanowo, Masovian Voivodeship
- Stefanowo, Podlaskie Voivodeship
- Stefanowo, Kościerzyna County, Pomeranian Voivodeship
- Stefanowo, Puck County in Pomeranian Voivodeship
- Stefanowo, Warmian-Masurian Voivodeship
