= Astronomical Observatory of Lviv University =

Observatory in Lviv, Ukraine

- Organization: Lviv University
- Observatory code: 067
- Location: Lviv, Ukraine
- Coordinates: 49°49′58″N 24°01′47″E
- Altitude: 350 metres (1,150 ft)
- Established: 1771
- Website: astro.lnu.edu.ua

The Astronomical Observatory of Lviv University is the astronomical observatory of the Ivan Franko National University of Lviv in Lviv, Ukraine. It was founded in 1771 by the Jesuit college of Lviv, which makes it the 17th oldest observatory in Europe. It was closed around 1783 and restored as part of Lviv University in 1900 as the Astronomical Institute and again as the Observatory in 1912. Operations were interrupted by the Second World War, after which the Observatory became part of the University of Lviv in 1945. Research at the observatory encompasses observational and theoretical studies in cosmology, relativistic astrophysics, and stellar astrophysics.

== History ==
=== Foundation ===
The first documented astronomical observations in Lviv date back to the mid 18th century. They are associated with the patron of the Jesuit College (of the University), an outstanding religious figure, Lviv archbishop Vaclav Yeronim Ciarakovskyi (1700 – 1780). In terms of technical aspects Father Dominic Lysohorskyi, Canon from Bzhozov helped the archbishop.

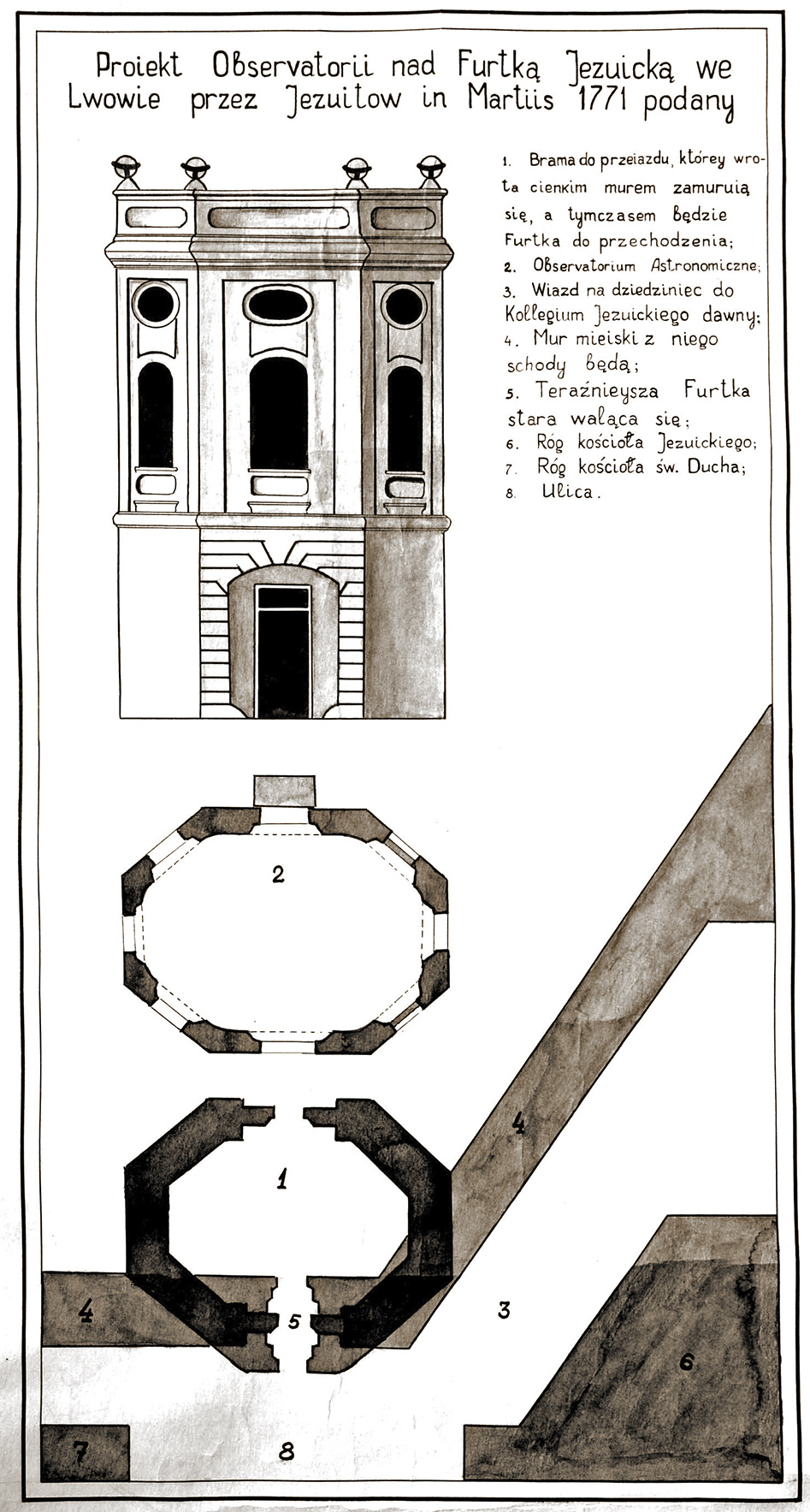
A copy of the project of the astronomical observatory of 1771, by Sebastian Sierakowski. (stored in the observatory of the university)

The first record about the construction of the observatory was found in the archival collection from the city register on the activity of the Jesuit Order in Lviv (The central state historical archive collection No. 52, description No. 52, profile No. 234): “On April 27, 1771, the Jesuit College willing to build the astronomical observatory in Lviv was struggling to obtain the permission from the local government to knock down the old gates and together build a new astronomical observatory funded by the Jesuit College. The city of Lviv gave the permission on the condition that when the observatory was needed to be used with the educational purpose, it should be returned to the city”. In addition, the city spared 4 weeks for the construction works to be finished and required Jesuits to arrange the surrounding area, create a project and place the city emblem on the gate.

After Galicia had been joined to the Austrian empire the astronomical observatory got an order from the Austrian government to conduct a geodesic observation of the Kingdom of Galicia and Lodomeria. Yuzef Lisganig (1719-1799), a former Jesuit who used to the prefect of the astronomical observatory in Vienna supervised the observation with the young scientist, Austrian engineer Franz Xaver von Zach assisting him. The latter became an outstanding astronomist: he founded the most modern as far as equipment is concerned observatory, published one of the first astronomical periodicals “Monthly press” (“Monatlische Corespodenz”), created the first astronomical congress ever existing.

In 1784 the University underwent another reform a more radical one. This observatory was no longer mentioned in the foundation diploma after the reform. Apparently, the observatory building was knocked down, but the new one was not constructed. This fact may be confirmed by an article in the magazine “Monatlische Corespodenz” (vol. 4, November, 1801, pages 547-558).

There is no documentary evidence on the work of the Astronomical observatory as the site for conducting regular celestial observations throughout the 19th century. However, astronomical studies were being developed and encourages by such university scientists as August Kutsenko. Ignatsy Lemokh, Woyzeck Urbanskyi and others. A number of books and non-fiction literature was published in Lviv at that time.

=== Renaissance ===
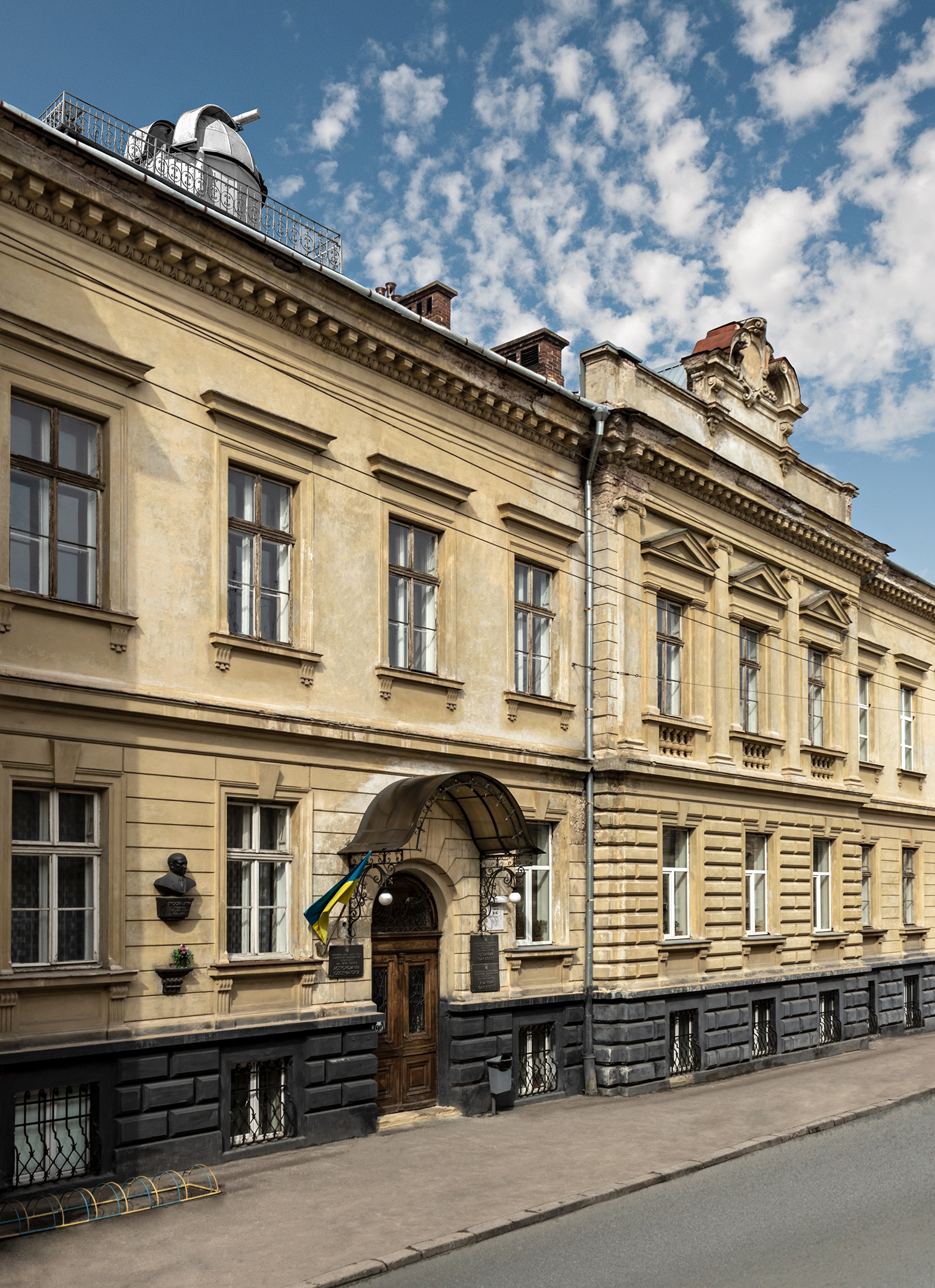
The building of the Faculty of Physics and the Astronomical Observatory on the street Cyril and Methodius (view from the street). At the top left is a fragment of the roof area and the dome of the pavilion with the Zeiss refractor.

The development of natural sciences at Lviv University urged its teaching staff to apply to the Ministry of Education in Vienna with the petition to found the department of astronomy at Lviv University. In 1897 this decision was solved in a positive way and the ministry approved professor Václav Láska, the head of the spherical astronomy and higher geodesy department, the head of Lviv Polytechnic astronomical observatory as a private docent of astronomy at Lviv University.

Later in 1900, the minister approved the habilitation act of doctor Marcin Ernst being appointed for the position of a private docent of astronomy at Lviv University, who started teaching astronomy at the university. In 1907 M. Ernst was appointed an extraordinary and in 1912 – an ordinary professor of astronomy at Lviv University. Thanks to the foundation of the department of astronomy back in 1900 the Astronomical Institute was established at the university, which later became Astronomical Observatory again.

During the period when M. Ernst was holding the position of the head of the observatory, Merc and Zendter’s refractor (D=134 mm, F=180 sm), universal tool, pendulum clock (Salmoiradgy company), medium solar chronometer, Ditisheym solar chronometer and a number of the laboratory tools were purchased, an astronomical library was also established. During Ernst being the head of the department, the latter together with the astronomical department were functioning as a united educational complex, the staff of which (professors, assistant and preparators) provided conducting the lecture, practical and laboratory classes on astronomy.

After Ernst's death in 1930 an outstanding physicist, honourable professor of the university Henryk Arctowski was appointed the head of the observatory. In 1932 doctor Euheniusz Rybka was appointed for this position who renewed the students’ intake attending the courses of astronomy, extended the staff, the scope of scientific topics and the observatory tools, started observing variable stars and working in the sphere of star photometry.

The periodical in English called “Contributions from the Astronomical Institute of Lvov University” was also founded at that time. Stellar and solar chronographs of Narden company’s make were purchased to improve the material basis and organize systematic observations. In 1934 the camera with Zeiss triplet objective (D=100 мм, F=50 см) was created at the university of Vienna, three sites for the Merc’s refractor, astronomical camera (D=140 мм, F=70 см) and for Zeiss’ refractor (D=130 мм, F=240 см) were constructed.

Starting from 1939, the war made its own adjustments into the observatory operation but did not prevent it. Some of the books, adding machine and chronograph were requisitioned.

=== After World War II ===
In September 1945 all employees of Polish origin emigrated to Poland. The observatory staff was replenished by the scientists who moved to Lviv from other astronomical establishments of the USSR, the scope of scientific research was extended, namely with Physics of the Sun (V. Stepanov, T. Mandarynkina, R. Teplytska, H. Radianov), solar activity and solar and terrestrial connections (M. Eheysen), celestial mechanics (N. Yelienievska, V. Rohachenko), stellar physics, interstellar medium and relativity astrophysics (S. Kaplan). Variable and new stars, comets and lunar eclipse photographic observations were being conducted. They also started the edition of the Lviv university observatory circular. The astronomical observatory became a scientific establishment of the university.

In 1957 the station of the optical observations of satellites, conducting regular visual, photographic and later photographic observations was established. In 1988 they started locating the satellite with the help of a laser rangefinder. In 1992 the Ministry of Education took a decision to create the network of laser local complexes of the 4th generation site. Lviv University observatory was the participant of this programme. In 1992-1998 another pavilion was built and equipment purchased needed for a laser complex based on 1m telescope TPL-1M (ТПЛ-1М). In December 1998 first results of satellite laser telescope were obtained and since August 2002 Ivan Franko National University of Lviv satellite laser ranging site has been included into the International laser ranging service (ILRS) as the one meeting the international observation accuracy requirements (O. Lohvynenko, Ya. Blahodyr, B. Melekh, A. Bilinskyi).

Since 1980s coworkers of the Observatory (B. Novosyadlyj, Yu.Chorniy, S. Apunevych, Yu. Kulinich, O. Serhienko and M. Tsizh) began working in the theoretical field on the problems of the galaxy origin and a large-scale structure of the Universe.

== Structure ==
The main structural units of the Observatory are scientific departments, which are formed in accordance with the main areas of research:

- Department of Solar Physics;
- Department of Physics of Stars and Galaxies;
- Department of Relativistic Astrophysics and Cosmology;
- Department of Practical Astronomy and Near Space Physics.

The observatory also has the following auxiliary structures: the library of the Astronomical Observatory; telescope maintenance department.
