= Babiak, Koło County =

Babiak
- Village
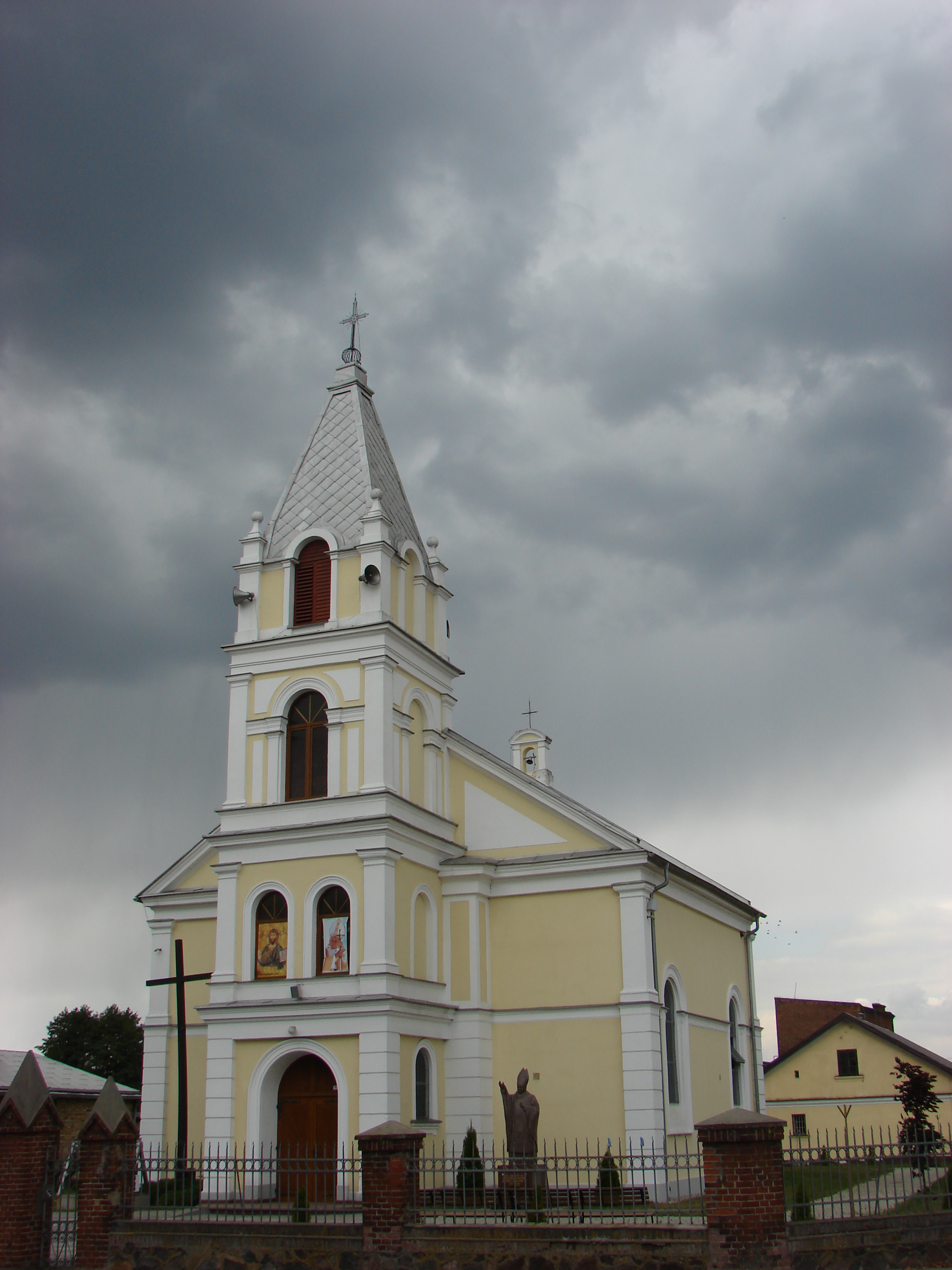
- Church of the Transfiguration of Christ

- Location within Poland
- Coordinates: 52°20′37″N 18°39′58″E
- Country: Poland
- Voivodeship: Greater Poland
- County: Koło
- Gmina: Babiak

Population
  - Total: 1,700
- Time zone: UTC+1 (CET)
  - Summer (DST): UTC+2 (CEST)

Babiak [ˈbabjak] is a village in Koło County, Greater Poland Voivodeship, in central Poland. It is the seat of the gmina (administrative district) called Gmina Babiak.

== History ==
Town rights were granted in 1816 and revoked in 1870.

Three Polish citizens were murdered by Nazi Germany in the village during World War II.
