= Krukowo, Greater Poland Voivodeship =

Krukowo
- Village
- Location within Poland
- Coordinates: 52°19′9″N 18°40′0″E
- Country: Poland
- Voivodeship: Greater Poland
- County: Koło
- Gmina: Babiak

Population
  - Total: 80
- Time zone: UTC+1 (CET)
  - Summer (DST): UTC+2 (CEST)

Krukowo [kruˈkɔvɔ] is a village in the administrative district of Gmina Babiak, within Koło County, Greater Poland Voivodeship, in central Poland.
