= Gmina Kłodawa, Greater Poland Voivodeship =

Gmina Kłodawa Kłodawa Commune
- Gmina
- Coat of arms

- Map showing Gmina Kłodawa in Koło County

- Map showing Koło County in the Greater Poland Voivodeship
- Coordinates (Kłodawa): 52°15′2″N 18°54′56″E
- Country: Poland
- Voivodeship: Greater Poland
- County: Koło
- Seat: Kłodawa

Area
  - Total: 128.97 km^{2} (49.80 sq mi)

Population (2006)
  - Total: 13,307
  - Density: 103.18/km^{2} (267.23/sq mi)
  - Urban: 6,829
  - Rural: 6,478
- Time zone: UTC+1 (CET)
  - Summer (DST): UTC+2 (CEST)
- Vehicle registration: PKL
- Website: http://www.klodawa.wlkp.pl

Gmina Kłodawa is an urban-rural gmina (administrative district) in Koło County, Greater Poland Voivodeship, in central Poland. Its seat is the town of Kłodawa, which lies approximately 21 kilometres (13 mi) east of Koło and 138 km (86 mi) east of the regional capital Poznań.

The gmina covers an area of 128.97 square kilometres (49.8 sq mi), and as of 2006 its total population is 13,307 (out of which the population of Kłodawa amounts to 6,829, and the population of the rural part of the gmina is 6,478).

== Villages ==
Apart from the town of Kłodawa, Gmina Kłodawa contains the villages and settlements of Bierzwienna Długa, Bierzwienna Długa-Kolonia, Bierzwienna Krótka, Cząstków, Dąbrówka, Dębina, Dzióbin, Głogowa, Górki, Janczewy, Kęcerzyn, Kobylata, Korzecznik, Krzykosy, Łążek, Leszcze, Łubno, Luboniek, Okoleniec, Podgajew, Pomarzany Fabryczne, Rgielew, Rycerzew, Rysiny, Rysiny-Kolonia, Słupeczka, Straszków, Tarnówka, Wólka Czepowa and Zbójno.

== Neighbouring gminas ==
Gmina Kłodawa is bordered by the gminas of Babiak, Chodów, Grabów, Grzegorzew, Olszówka and Przedecz.
