= Bogusławice, Koło County =

Bogusławice
- Village
- Location within Poland
- Coordinates: 52°23′34″N 18°39′40″E
- Country: Poland
- Voivodeship: Greater Poland
- County: Koło
- Gmina: Babiak
- Elevation: 105 m (344 ft)

Population
  - Total: 436
- Time zone: UTC+1 (CET)
  - Summer (DST): UTC+2 (CEST)
- Vehicle registration: PKL

Bogusławice [bɔɡuswaˈvit͡sɛ] is a village in the administrative district of Gmina Babiak, within Koło County, Greater Poland Voivodeship, in central Poland.
