= Grünbach (Tauber) =

River in Germany

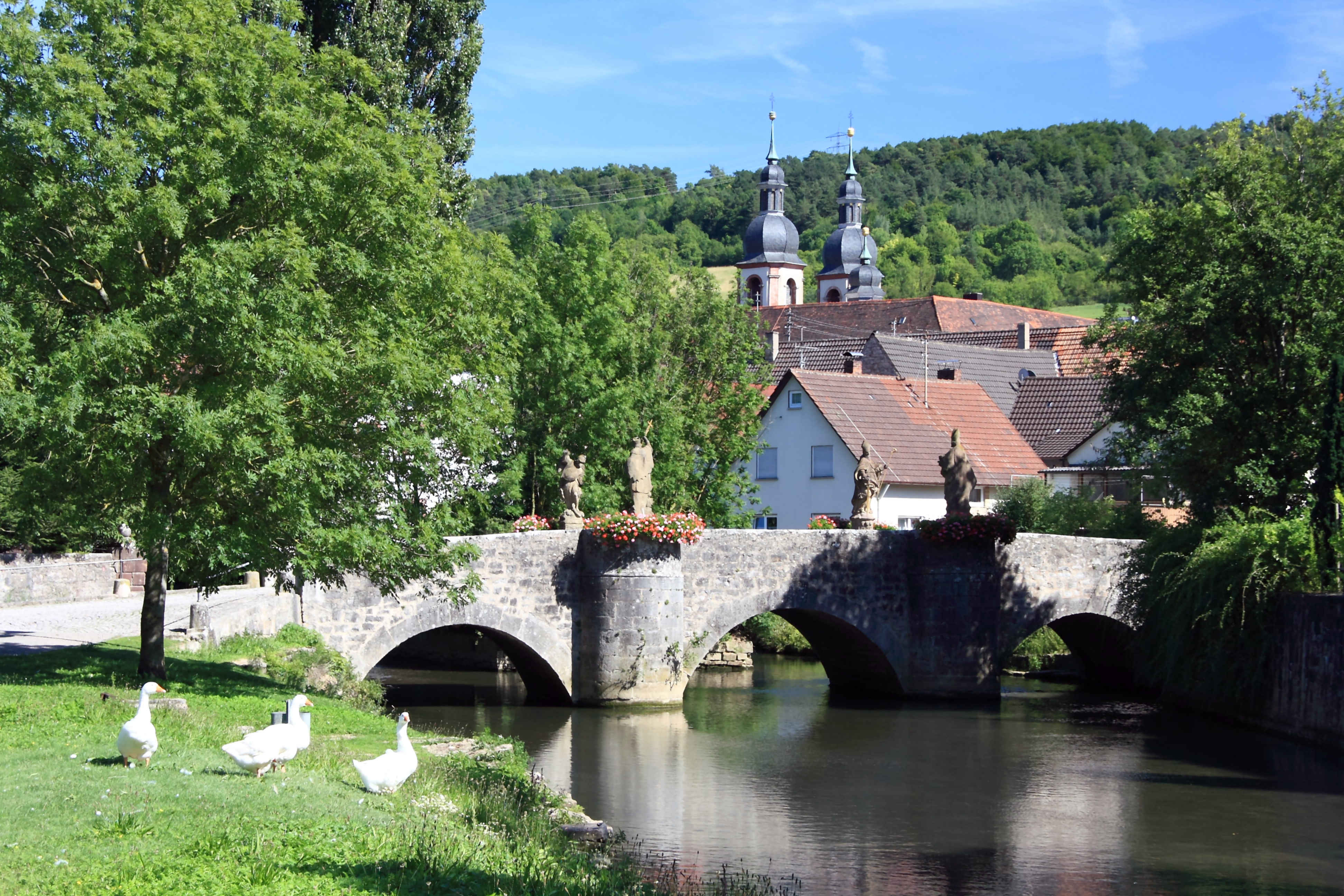

Location
- Country: Germany
- State: Baden-Württemberg

Physical characteristics
- Mouth
  - location: Tauber
  - coordinates: 49.5792°N 9.7058°E
- Length: 30.8 km (19.1 mi)

Basin features
- Progression: Tauber→ Main→ Rhine→ North Sea
- River system: 252 km (157 mi)

Grünbach is a river of Baden-Württemberg, Germany. It passes through Grünsfeld and flows into the Tauber near Lauda-Königshofen.

== See also ==
- List of rivers of Baden-Württemberg
