= Koło County =

Koło County Powiat kolski
- County
- Flag Coat of arms

- Location within the voivodeship

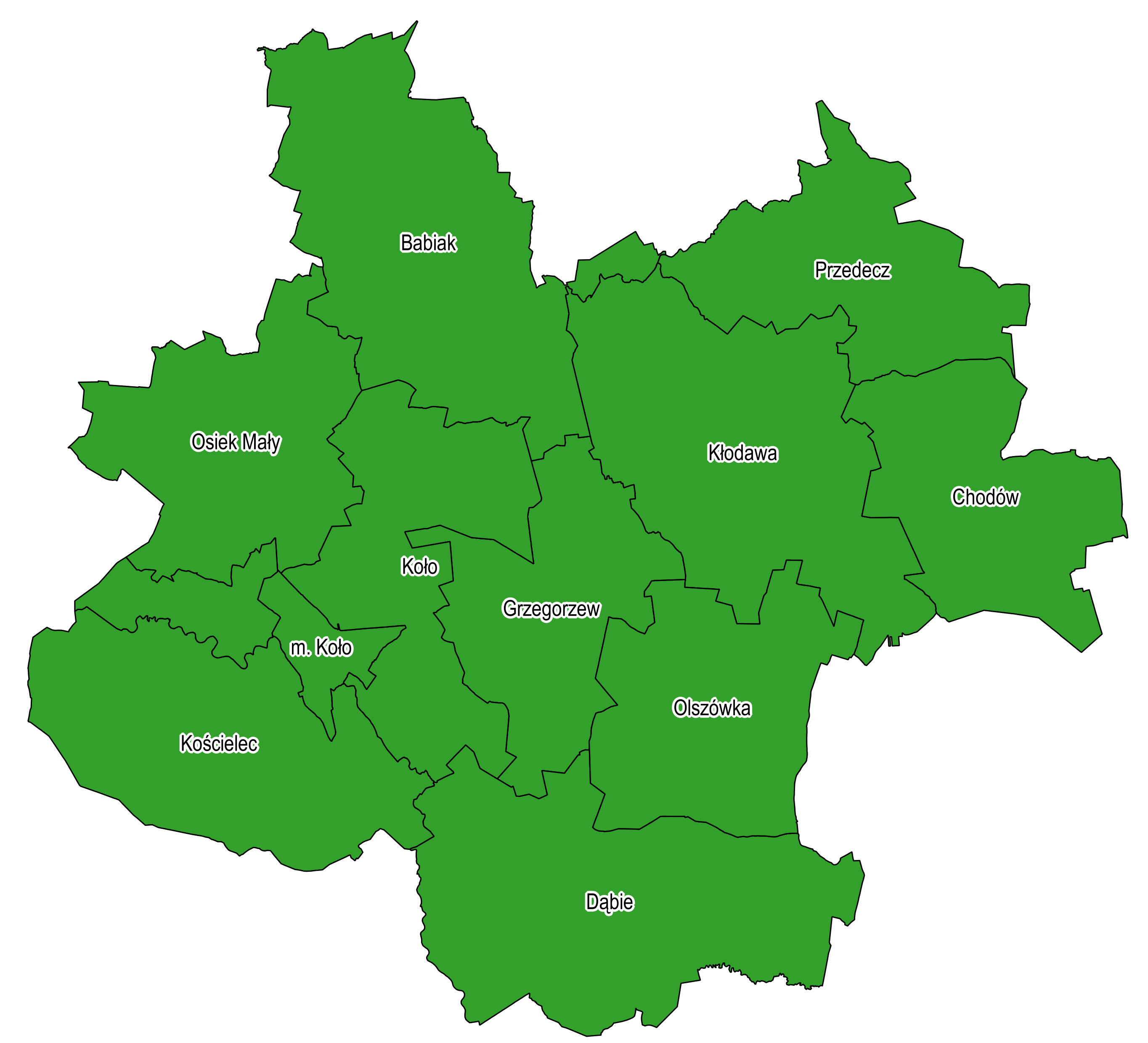
- Division into gminas
- Coordinates (Koło): 52°12′N 18°38′E
- Country: Poland
- Voivodeship: Greater Poland
- Seat: Koło
- Gminas: Total 11 (incl. 1 urban): Koło; Gmina Babiak; Gmina Chodów; Gmina Dąbie; Gmina Grzegorzew; Gmina Kłodawa; Gmina Koło; Gmina Kościelec; Gmina Olszówka; Gmina Osiek Mały; Gmina Przedecz

Area
  - Total: 1,011.03 km^{2} (390.36 sq mi)

Population (2010)
  - Total: 88,244
  - Density: 87.281/km^{2} (226.06/sq mi)
  - Urban: 33,721
  - Rural: 54,880
- Time zone: UTC+1 (CET)
  - Summer (DST): UTC+2 (CEST)
- Car plates: PKL
- Website: www.starostwokolskie.pl

Koło County (Polish: powiat kolski) is a unit of territorial administration and local government (powiat) in Greater Poland Voivodeship, central Poland. It came into being on January 1, 1999, as a result of the Polish local government reforms in 1998. Its administrative seat and largest town is Koło, which lies 119 kilometres (74 mi) east of the regional capital Poznań. The county contains three other towns: Kłodawa, 21 km (13 mi) east of Koło, Dąbie, 19 km (12 mi) south-east of Koło, and Przedecz, 21 km (13 mi) north-east of Koło.

The county covers an area of 1,011.03 square kilometres (390.4 sq mi). As of 2010, its total population was 88,244, out of which the population of Koło was 23,034, that of Kłodawa was 6,829, that of Dąbie was 2,087, that of Przedecz was 1,771, and the rural population was 54,880.

== History ==
Unit formed in Kalisz Governorate in 1867, since 1918 in the Second Polish Republic, German Landkreis Warthbrücken during World War II, later in Polish People's Republic, dissolved in 1975, reconstructed in 1998.

== Neighbouring counties ==
Koło County is bordered by Radziejów County and Włocławek County to the north, Kutno County and Łęczyca County to the east, Poddębice County to the south-east, Turek County to the south, and Konin County to the west.

== Administrative divisions ==
The county is subdivided into 11 gminas (one urban, three urban-rural and seven rural). These are listed in the following table, in descending order of population.

Gmina	Type	Area (km²)	Population (2006)	Seat
Koło	urban	13.9	23,034	
Gmina Kłodawa	urban-rural	129.0	13,307	Kłodawa
Gmina Babiak	rural	133.6	7,920	Babiak
Gmina Koło	rural	101.9	6,995	Koło *
Gmina Kościelec	rural	105.9	6,667	Kościelec
Gmina Dąbie	urban-rural	130.1	6,644	Dąbie
Gmina Osiek Mały	rural	87.3	5,866	Osiek Mały
Gmina Grzegorzew	rural	73.4	5,617	Grzegorzew
Gmina Olszówka	rural	81.5	4,757	Olszówka
Gmina Przedecz	urban-rural	76.5	4,319	Przedecz
Gmina Chodów	rural	78.0	3,475	Chodów
* seat not part of the gmina

== See also ==
- Dobrowska Foundation
