= Nagórna, Koło =

Nagórna
- Coat of arms
- Interactive map of Nagórna
- Coordinates: 52°12′18″N 18°39′20″E
- Country: Poland
- Voivodeship: Greater Poland
- Powiat: Koło County
- Town: Koło
- Postal code: 62-600

Nagórna was a village near the town of Koło in central Poland until 1924, when it formally became a district within that town. It is located northeast of the town centre along Ulica Nagórna w Kole (Nagórna and Kole Street).

== History ==
Like nearby Blizna, with which it has always had a close relationship, it had Warsaw Bridgehead line of fortifications along its southern border. Its area was about 1,624 morgas and it paid rent to Koło each year. In 1362 it was bought by Jan Henryk of Warta. On 19 June 1566 Sigismund II Augustus drew the village's boundaries. In the 16th century it had about 33 inhabitants. The municipal authorities leased the village to the townspeople of Koło from 1616 to 1619. In 1808 the village's taxes funded the establishment of a primary school in Koło. As of 1817 that was housed in former farm buildings, leasing other buildings to house it the following year. On 14 December 1865 Seweryn Antonowicz Kłosowski was born in the village - he is notable for three murders in Victorian London.

Until 1924 it was in the commune of Czołowo, itself within Koło County, which was in turn within the Governorate of Kalisz (until 1919) then of Łódź. On 1 January 1925 Nagórną was formally merged into the town of Koło - it had already been brought within Koło's administrative boundaries the previous year but had retained its rural character. To this day farmers have their arable land near the city border and they also breed livestock.

In January 1945 the main battles to liberate Koło from the Germans occurred in what was now the Nagórna district - 132 Soviet soldiers were killed and are buried in Koło Military Cemetery on Ulica Poległych. In the mid-1990s construction began on a multi-family block of flats - around 2,500 people currently live in it. The estate is nicknamed 'kwiatowym' ('flower') after the names of the nearby streets (Tulipanowa, Konwaliowa, Narcyzowa and Różana). On 1 November 2005 Wiesław Mering, Bishop of Włocławek set up a new parish church on the estate, dedicated to Saint Bogumilus and with a parish covering the whole former village of Nagórna.

== Bibliography (in Polish) ==
- Józef Burszta, 600 lat miasta Koła, Poznań 1963
- Paweł Łączkowski, Mieczysław Pochwicki, Koło. Rozwój miasta 1948-1978, Poznań-Koło 1978
- Mujta, Józef Stanisław (1997). 635 lat miasta Koła. Koło: Muzeum Technik Ceramicznych : Kolskie Towarzystwo Kulturalne. ISBN 83-86139-34-X.
- Józef Stanisław Mujta, Koło w dokumentach, Konin-Koło 1998
- Mujta, Józef Stanisław (2003). Parafia Rzymskokatolicka pod wezwaniem Podwyższenia Świętego Krzyża w Kole : zarys dziejów. Koło: Muzeum Technik Ceramicznych. ISBN 83-919609-0-0.
- Gorczyca, Krzysztof; Witkowski (2007). Najdawniejsze dzieje Koła : (do lat 20. XVI stulecia). Koło: Muzeum Technik Ceramicznych. ISBN 978-83-919609-2-9.
