= Wrząca Wielka =

Wrząca Wielka may refer to the following places in Poland:

- Wrząca Wielka, Lower Silesian Voivodeship (south-west Poland)
- Wrząca Wielka, Greater Poland Voivodeship (central Poland)
