= Gmina Koło =

Gmina Koło Koło Commune
- Gmina
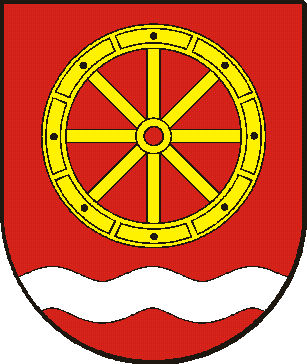
- Coat of arms

- Coordinates (Koło): 52°12′N 18°38′E
- Country: Poland
- Voivodeship: Greater Poland
- County: Koło
- Seat: Koło

Area
  - Total: 101.88 km^{2} (39.34 sq mi)

Population (2006)
  - Total: 6,995
  - Density: 68.66/km^{2} (177.8/sq mi)
- Time zone: UTC+1 (CET)
  - Summer (DST): UTC+2 (CEST)
- Vehicle registration: PKL

Gmina Koło is a rural gmina (administrative district) in Koło County, Greater Poland Voivodeship, in central Poland. Its seat is the town of Koło, although the town is not part of the territory of the gmina.

The gmina covers an area of 101.88 square kilometres (39.3 sq mi), and as of 2006 its total population is 6,995.

== Villages ==
Gmina Koło contains the villages and settlements of Aleksandrówka, Borki, Chojny, Czołowo, Czołowo-Kolonia, Dąbrowa, Dzierawy, Kaczyniec, Kamień, Kiełczew Górny, Kiełczew Smużny Czwarty, Kiełczew Smużny Pierwszy, Leśnica, Lubiny, Lucjanowo, Mikołajówek, Ochle, Podlesie, Powiercie, Powiercie-Kolonia, Przybyłów, Ruchenna, Skobielice, Sokołowo, Stellutyszki, Wandynów, Wrząca Wielka and Zawadka.

== Neighbouring gminas ==
Gmina Koło is bordered by the town of Koło and by the gminas of Babiak, Dąbie, Grzegorzew, Kościelec, Kramsk and Osiek Mały.
