= Hendecahedron =

Polyhedron with 11 faces

A hendecahedron (or undecahedron) is a polyhedron with 11 faces. The name is based on its meaning: "hen-" represents one, "deca" represents ten, and the suffix "-hedron".

== Convex polyhedra ==
In all the convex hendecahedra, there are a total of 440,564 convex ones with distinct differences in topology. There are significant differences in the structure of topology, which means two types of polyhedrons cannot be transformed by moving vertex positions, twisting, or scaling, such as a pentagonal pyramid and a nine diagonal column. They can't change with each other, so their topology structure is different. However, the pentagonal prism and enneagonal prism can interchange by stretching out or drawing back one of the nine sides of the scale, so the triangulum prism and the triangulum pyramid have no obvious difference in topology.

Several polyhedra with eleven faces are the following:

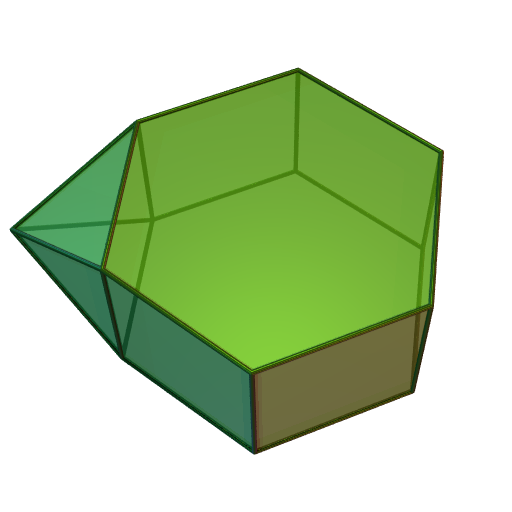
Augmented hexagonal prism: a Johnson solid, obtained by attaching an to one of the square faces of a uniform hexagonal prism. The resulting polyhedron has four equilateral triangles, five squares, and two regular hexagons as its faces.

Biaugmented triangular prism: a Johnson solid with ten equilateral triangular and one square faces. Obtained by attaching two equilateral square pyramids onto the square faces of a uniform triangular prism.

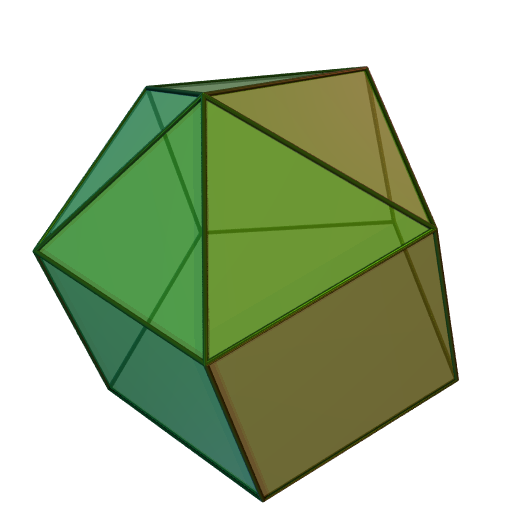
Elongated pentagonal pyramid: a Johnson solid, obtained by attacing a regular-faced pentagonal pyramid to one of the bases of a uniform pentagonal prism. The resulting polyhedron has five equilateral triangles, five squares, and one regular pentagon as its faces. It is a self-dual polyhedron, which has eleven faces.

Bisymmetric hendecahedron: a space-filling polyhedron. The Cartesian coordinates are $(0,0,\pm 2)$, $(\pm 2, 1, \pm 1)$, $(0,-1,\pm 1)$, $(0,2,0)$, $(\pm1, -1,0)$. The sphenoid hendecahedron is another space-filling polyhedron with eleven faces, which can be assembled into layers of the Floret tiling, which in turn are stacked to fill space.

Decagonal pyramid: a pyramid with ten triangular lateral faces and a decagonal base.

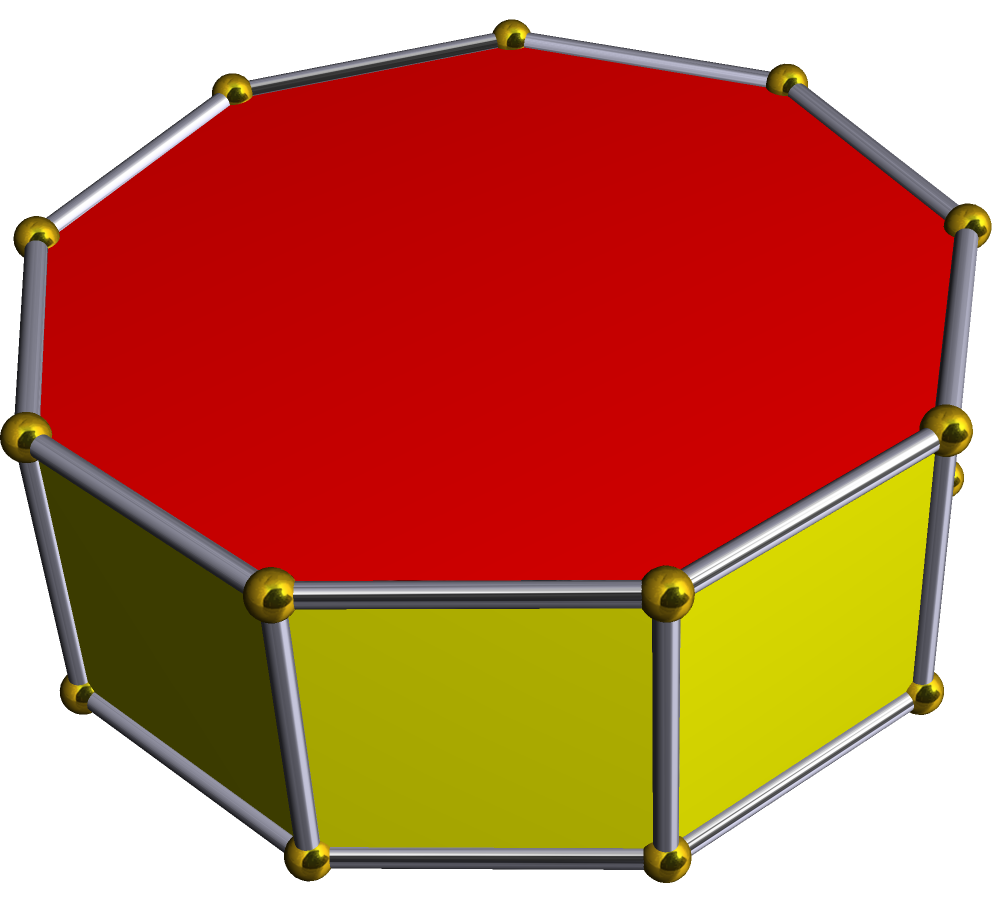
A prism with two enneagon bases and nine quadrilateral faces.

== In chemistry ==
In chemistry, after removing all 18 sides in borane hydrogen ions ([B_{11}H_{11}]), it is an octadecahedron. If making a perpendicular to the center of gravity to the surface of a boron atom, a new polyhedron is constructed, which is 18 surface structures of the dual polyhedron, also one of hendecahedra.

== See also ==
- K-dron
