= Koło Castle =

Gothic castle in Poland, built in 1362

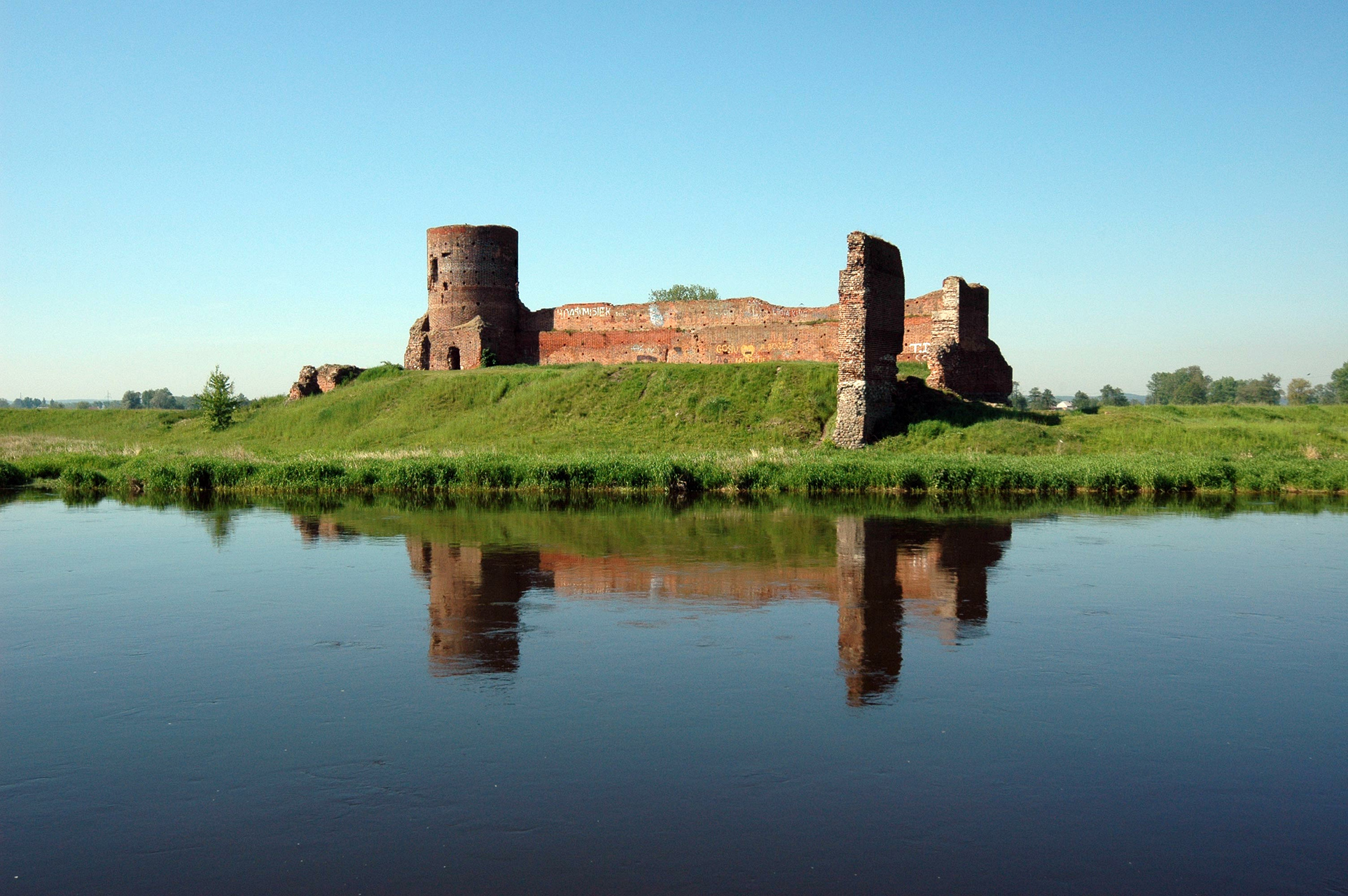
- Koło Castle

- Location of the Koło Castle in Poland
- 52°11′52″N 18°36′30″E
- Location: Gozdów, Greater Poland Voivodeship, in Poland

History
- Built: 1362

Site notes
- Architectural style: Gothic

Koło Castle - a Gothic castle, which according to Jan Długosz was raised by Casimir III the Great before the year of 1362 (when Koło received its town rights). The castle secured the route from Greater Poland to Łęczyca, in the lowlands of the River Warta. The castle is located on an artificial hill on a meander of the River Warta. During the raising of the castle, the river had a number of tributaries in the area, which were important for the castle's strategic location.

== History ==
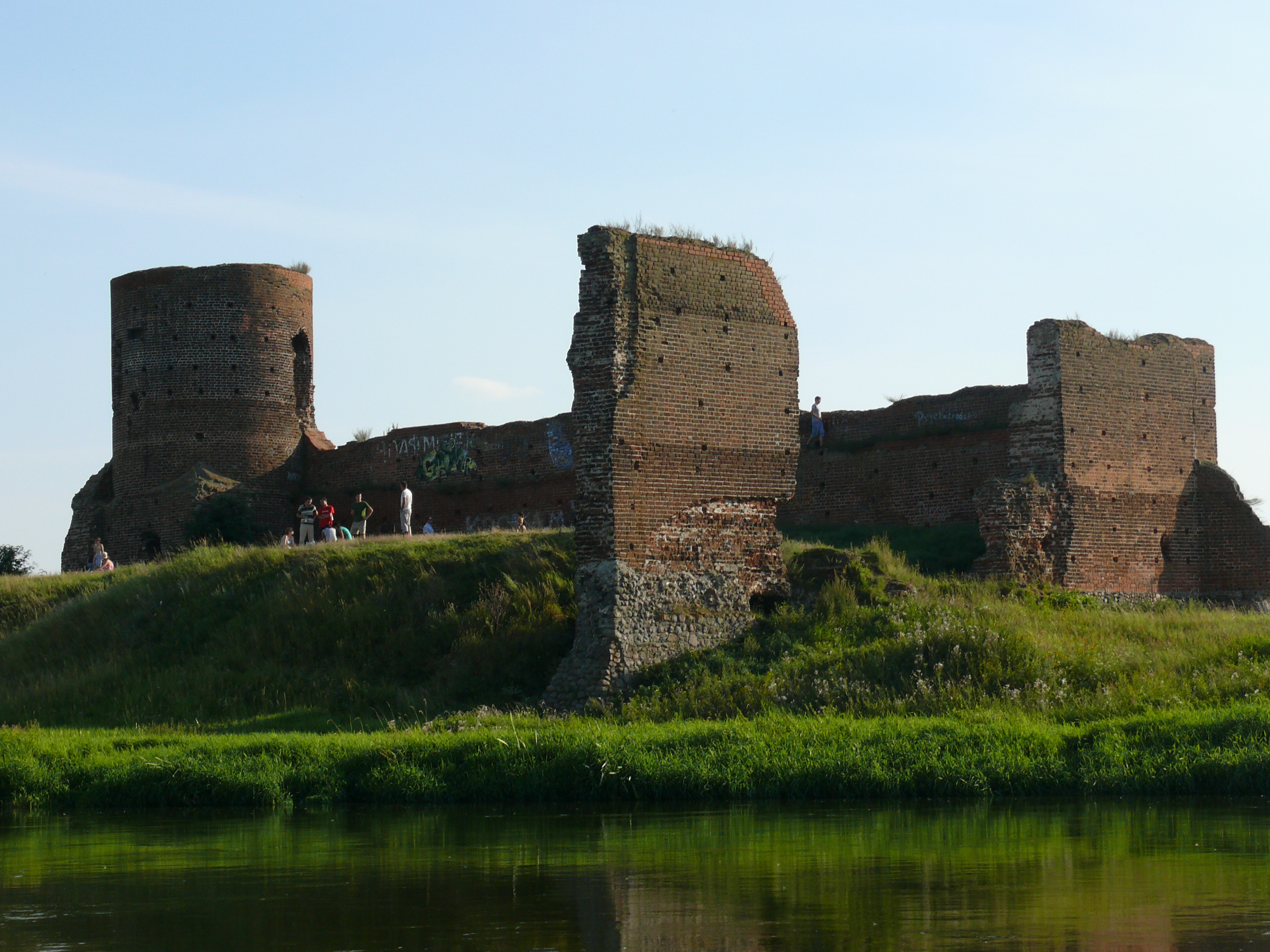
The castle as seen from the village of Dzierawy.

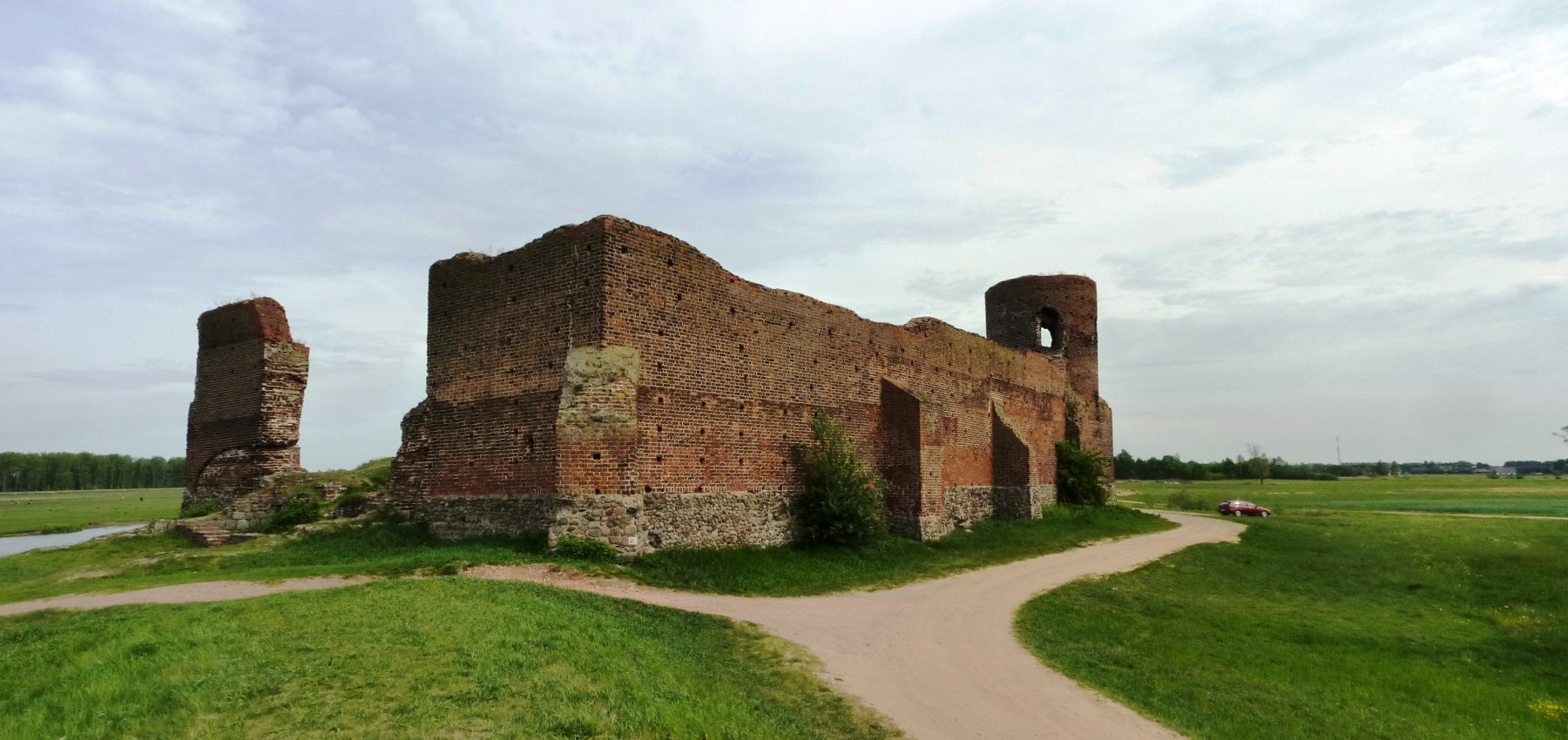
The castle from the western corner.

According to the documents by Jan Długosz, the castle was built before 1362; when Casimir III the Great called for the construction of the castle. The castle was built towards the end of Casimir's reign, and it is uncertain if the king has ever stayed in the castle; as there are no sources which would state otherwise.

Archaeological finds indicate that the first defensive structures were built before the reign of Casimir III the Great; the tower - a donjon was built on a stone foundation, surrounded by a wooden and soil embankment which may have been built under the order of Bolesław the Pious (according to M. Żemigała), Henryk Głogowczyk, Wenceslaus II of Bohemia (according to T. Poklewski-Kozieło). The gord is surrounded by the flood waters of the River Warta.

During the reign of Casimir III the Great, the town hall, the Church of the Holy Cross were built in Koło (the town's first stone buildings).

Casimir III the Great received the legation of the Lizard Union in the castle. After the Battle of Grunwald important decisions regarding the Polish–Lithuanian–Teutonic War were thought of in the castle. During the years of 1476 to 1481 the castle was the residence for the Princess Anna of Sochaczew. In the mid-sixteenth century the castle began to deteriorate. In 1655 the castle was taken by the Swedes. In the eighteenth century Augustus III of Poland gave the castle to the Bernardinians of Koło, which had partially deconstructed the castle to reconstruct a damaged monastery; however due to the strong mortar the castle could not be fully deconstructed.

The castle in Koło was an important stronghold. In the 1950s the castle had undergone renovation. During archaeological studies in the 1970s the archaeologists discovered an unknown foundation, which allowed for the full reconstruction of the castle. Many other archaeological finds were discovered: glass from the windows, glass dishes and a chess piece. However it is unknown where the main gate of the castle is located.
