= George Chapman (murderer) =

Polish killer (1865–1903)

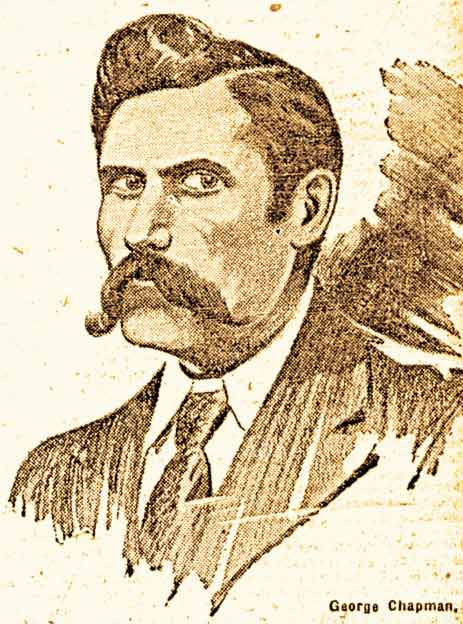
- Born: Seweryn Antonowicz Kłosowski; 14 December 1865; Nagórna, Congress Poland
- Died: 7 April 1903 (aged 37); Wandsworth Prison, London, England
- Cause of death: Execution by hanging
- Other name: Ludwig Schloski
- Status: Executed
- Conviction: Murder
- Penalty: Death

Details
- Victims: 3 confirmed and known
- Span of crimes: 1897–1902
- Country: England
- Date apprehended: 1903

Seweryn Antonowicz Kłosowski (14 December 1865 – 7 April 1903), better known under his pseudonym George Chapman, was a Victorian-era Anglo-Polish serial killer known as the Borough Poisoner.

Born in Congress Poland, Chapman moved to England as an adult, where he committed his crimes. He was convicted and executed after poisoning three women, but is remembered today mostly because some contemporary police officers suspected him of being the notorious serial killer "Jack the Ripper".

== Early life ==
Seweryn Kłosowski was born to Antoni and Emilia Kłosowski in the village of Nagórna (today part of Koło) in the Warsaw Governorate of Congress Poland. His father was a carpenter. According to a certificate found in his personal effects after his arrest, he was apprenticed at age 14 to a senior surgeon, Moshko (Mosze) Rappaport, in Zwoleń, whom he assisted in procedures such as the application of leeches for blood-letting. He then enrolled on a course in practical surgery at the Warsaw Praga Hospital. This course was very brief, lasting from October 1885 to January 1886 (attested to by another certificate in his possession) but Kłosowski continued to serve as a nurse, or doctor's assistant, in Warsaw until December 1886.

Kłosowski later left Poland for the United Kingdom, settling in London; the exact time he arrived in the capital has never been reliably ascertained. A receipt for hospital fees from February 1887 indicating that Kłosowski was still there is the last record of him in Poland, and papers documenting his early life ended abruptly at that month, indicating that he potentially left for the UK at around that time. Witness testimony at his trial seems to indicate that he emigrated in 1888. Kłosowski settled in the East End and became a hairdresser's assistant in either late 1887 or early 1888, with records indicating that he worked for an Abraham Radin of 70 West India Dock Road. He stopped working there after five months, and he subsequently opened a barbershop at 126 Cable Street, St George in the East; this was also listed as his residence in an 1889 London directory. It is possible that this was his residence during the Jack the Ripper murders in the autumn of 1888.

In 1889, Kłosowski married a young Polish girl, Lucie Badewski, despite already having a wife back in Poland. He was soon confronted by his first wife, although she soon returned to Poland. The couple had two children and moved around different residences in London before moving to the United States in 1891. The last census record of them in London is from April of that year. The family settled in Jersey City, New Jersey, where Kłosowski found work in a barbershop. However, bitter fights often erupted between husband and wife, culminating in an incident in February 1892 in which Kłosowski attacked Lucie while she was pregnant and threatened to kill her. Lucie returned to London, moved in with her sister and gave birth to a daughter. Kłosowski himself eventually returned to London, and the two briefly reunited before ending their relationship permanently.

In 1893, while working as an assistant in Haddin's hairdresser shop, Kłosowski met a woman named Annie Chapman (no known relation to the Ripper victim). They began a relationship, moved in together and he took her surname, thereafter being known as George Chapman. In 1894, after almost a year of cohabiting, Chapman brought another woman to live with them, and a pregnant Annie left a few weeks later. In early 1895, Annie told Chapman about their baby, but he offered no support. That same year, he became an assistant in William Wenzel's barbershop at 7 Church Lane, Leytonstone, while lodging at the house of John Ward in Forest Road.

== Crimes and execution ==
Chapman took at least four mistresses, who posed as his wife; he killed three by poisoning. They were Mary Isabella Spink (1858 – 25 December 1897), Bessie Taylor (died 13 February 1901) and Maud Marsh (died 22 October 1902). He administered the compound tartar-emetic to each of them, having purchased it from a chemist in Hastings, Sussex. Rich in the metallic element antimony, tartar-emetic can, if used improperly, cause painful death with symptoms similar to arsenic poisoning.

Chapman had met Spink while working at Wenzel's barbershop. Spink, an alcoholic whose husband and son had left her, joined him in a fake marriage and left him a legacy of £500 (equivalent to £56,000 in 2025). They began living together and leased a barbershop in a poor section of Hastings. This business was unsuccessful, and they moved their shop to a more prosperous location and began offering "musical shaves", in which Spink played the piano while Chapman serviced the customers. This proved popular, and the couple earned a sizable income. Chapman eventually purchased his own sailing boat, which he named Mosquito. However, he repeatedly subjected Spink to brutal beatings. A woman who lived in the same building claimed to have often heard Spink crying out in the night and to have noticed abrasions and bruises on her face and marks on her throat. On 3 April 1897, Chapman purchased a one-ounce dose of tartar-emetic from the shop of William Davidson, a chemist in High Street.

Their barbershop eventually failed, and Chapman resorted to managing a pub in Bartholomew Square. It was there that he fatally poisoned Spink. Soon afterwards, he hired Taylor, who had been a restaurant manager, and they entered into a relationship. Chapman again became abusive, reportedly shouting at Taylor and at one point threatening her with a revolver. After she began demonstrating the same symptoms that Spink had shown, Chapman left London with her to avoid controversy, moving to the market town of Bishop's Stortford, Hertfordshire, where he ran The Grapes Pub. The couple eventually returned to London, where he leased the Monument Tavern. Despite an operation, Taylor's condition grew steadily worse and she died in 1901. Chapman also attempted to commit arson on the Monument Tavern, which was quickly losing its lease.

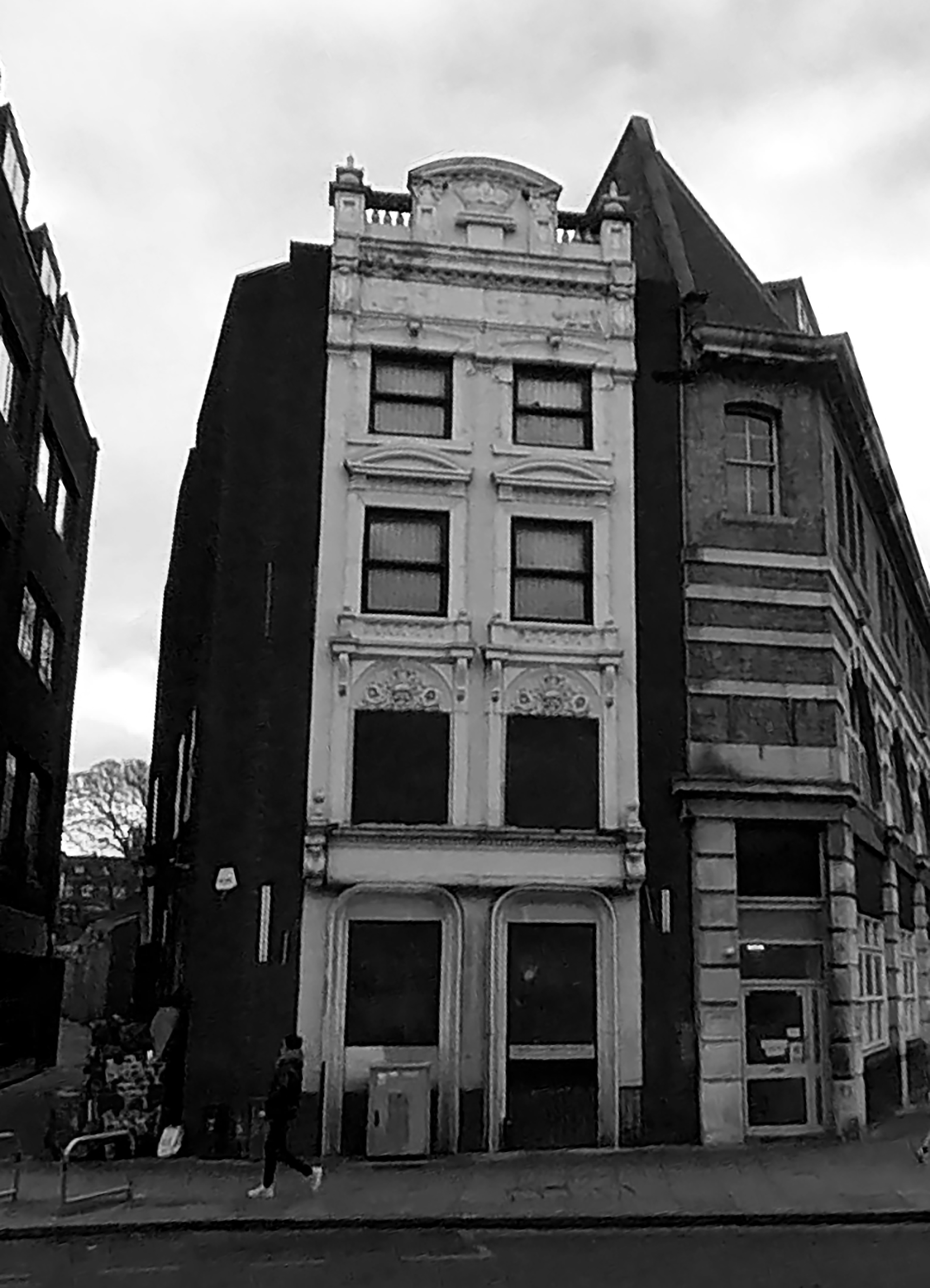
Crown public house in Borough High Street, Southwark, 2022

In August 1901, he hired Marsh as a barmaid for the Monument Tavern. He again entered into a false marriage with her and again engaged in physical abuse. She too was eventually poisoned to death. Suspicions surrounding this death led to a police investigation, which found that Marsh and the other two women, whose bodies were exhumed, had died by poisoning. An indictment for murder could contain only one count and Chapman was therefore charged only with the murder of Marsh. He was prosecuted by Sir Archibald Bodkin and the solicitor-general, Sir Edward Carson, convicted on 19 March 1903, sentenced to death by Mr Justice Grantham, and hanged at Wandsworth Prison on 7 April 1903.

Chapman's motives for these murders are unclear; they may have been purely psychological. While Spink had left him a legacy of £500, he gained nothing from the other two victims.

== Jack the Ripper suspect ==
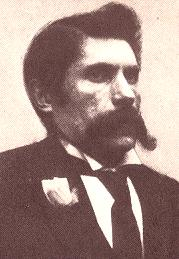
George Chapman

Inspector Frederick Abberline of Scotland Yard, who was one of the original investigators in the Ripper case, is reported to have told George Godley, the policeman who arrested Chapman: "You've got Jack the Ripper at last!" In two 1903 interviews with the Pall Mall Gazette, Abberline spelt out his suspicions, referring to Chapman by name. Abberline thought Chapman was the Ripper because, during the original investigation, he had closely interviewed Chapman's first "wife", Lucie Badewski, and she had told him that her husband often used to go out during the night for hours on end. Speculation in contemporary newspaper accounts and books has led to Chapman, like fellow serial killer Thomas Neill Cream, becoming one of many suspects in the Ripper murders. As far as is known, Chapman was not a suspect at the time of the murders.

Recent writers are divided about whether Chapman should be regarded as a serious Ripper suspect. Philip Sugden considered that Chapman is the most likely candidate among known Ripper suspects, but that the case against him is far from proven. However, John Eddleston rated Chapman at only two ("a remote possibility") on his zero-to-five rating of Ripper suspects. Paul Begg only dealt with Chapman briefly and evidently did not regard him as a serious suspect.

The case against Chapman rests mainly on the point that he undoubtedly was a violent misogynist. He was known to beat his common-law wives and was prone to other violent behaviour. While living in the US, Chapman allegedly forced his wife Lucie down on their bed and began to strangle her, only stopping to attend to a customer who walked into the shop which adjoined their room. When he left, she was said to have found a knife under the pillow. Chapman reportedly later told Lucie that he had planned to behead her, even pointing out the spot where he would have buried her and reciting what he would have said to their neighbours.

Chapman had arrived in Whitechapel roughly around the time the first murder took place. His description matched the man seen with Mary Jane Kelly (the fifth victim of the "canonical five") and the murders stopped when he left for the United States. It has even been suggested that he carried out a Ripper-style killing in New York City, the murder of Carrie Brown, but recent research suggests he did not reach the United States until after this murder.

Robert Milne, recently retired from the Metropolitan Police's Directorate of Forensic Services, presented a paper to the International Association for Identification Conference in 2011 and to the Chartered Society of Forensic Sciences in 2014, suggesting Chapman as the most likely Ripper suspect. Based on his expertise, review of investigation documents, and the use of geographical profiling software, he was convinced that the killer lived in the area of the murders; Chapman fit that bill accurately. Milne also discussed a 1902 (or 1901) murder victim, Mary Ann Austin, who had described a client before her death: "a Russian 5ft 7 inches tall with a black moustache [who] visited Mary and in the course of having sex stabbed her and tried to cut out her uterus."

However, there is a lack of any hard evidence that would link Chapman to the Ripper murders. The main argument against treating him as a serious suspect is that it would be unusual for a serial killer to change his modus operandi, from mutilation to poisoning, although some authorities have cast doubt on whether this is as unusual as is supposed. There is also some doubt about whether he could speak English at the time, as the Ripper would have almost certainly had to according to eyewitness reports about the suspect holding conversations with some of his victims, and whether as a recent immigrant, he would have had the intimate knowledge of the Whitechapel district that the Ripper seems to have had. The Ripper appears to have selected victims who were previously unknown to him, while Chapman killed acquaintances, and although Chapman did live in Whitechapel it was not particularly near the scene of the murders.

Chapman's story was dramatised twice by Towers of London, firstly in 1949 in Secrets of Scotland Yard as George Chapman... Poisoner, Publican and Lady Killer and then again in a 1951 episode of The Black Museum entitled "The Straight Razor". Both conclude with a brief argument for Chapman's identity as Jack the Ripper.

== See also ==
- Jack the Ripper suspects
- List of serial killers in the United Kingdom
