= Koło Military Cemetery =

Polish military cemetery

Coordinates: 52°12′12″N 18°38′50″E

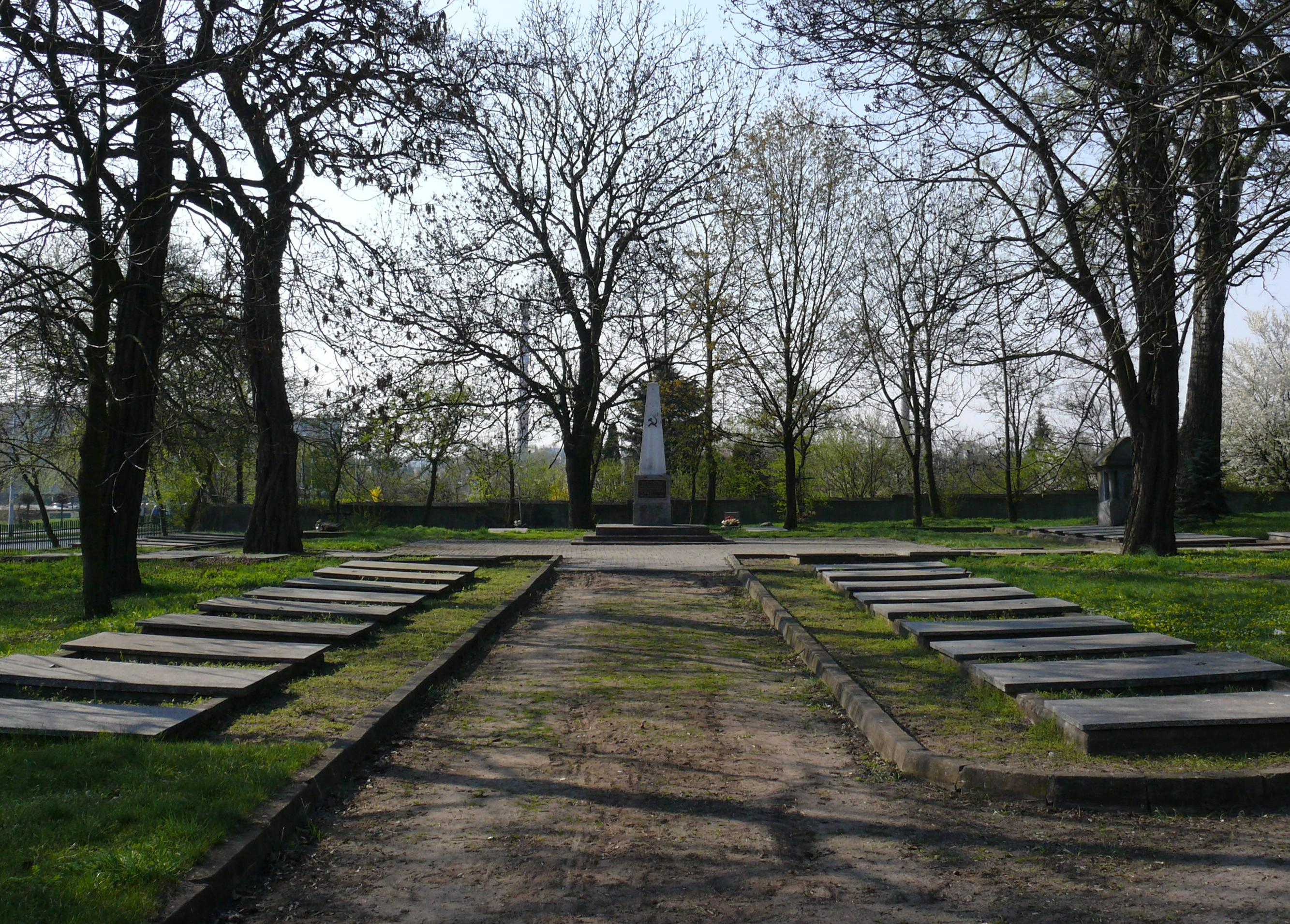

Koło Military Cemetery or Koło War Cemetery (Polish - Cmentarz wojenny w Kole; Russian - Коло Воинское кладбище) is a military cemetery located on the Przemieście Warszawskie housing estate in Koło, Poland. It includes the graves of Polish airman killed in the invasion of Poland in September 1939 and Soviet troops killed liberating the town in January 1945. In 1997 the bodies of thirteen Soviet troops exhumed at Słupca were also buried here.

In 2011 a mass grave of ninety German soldiers also killed in the fighting in 1945 was discovered within the cemetery. Surviving 19th century tombstones in the cemetery probably belong to Orthodox Christian inhabitants buried there, whilst after the Second World War the town's surviving Jewish inhabitants were buried there.

It is often in poor repair and home to street drinkers. Since 2014 local activists have been cleaning up the cemetery. In 2020 the Moldovan ambassador to Poland Iurie Bodrug visited the cemetery. On 30 June 2024 it was badly damaged by a storm which passed through the area.

== Monuments ==
=== Polish ===
This is to unknown Polish airmen killed in the 1939 invasion. It also mentions by name Second Lieutenant Tadeusz Sawicki and Corporal Brunon Ślebioda, who were killed at Koło on 5 September 1939, are mentioned by name. It is decorated with a cross and a broken propeller.

=== Soviet ===
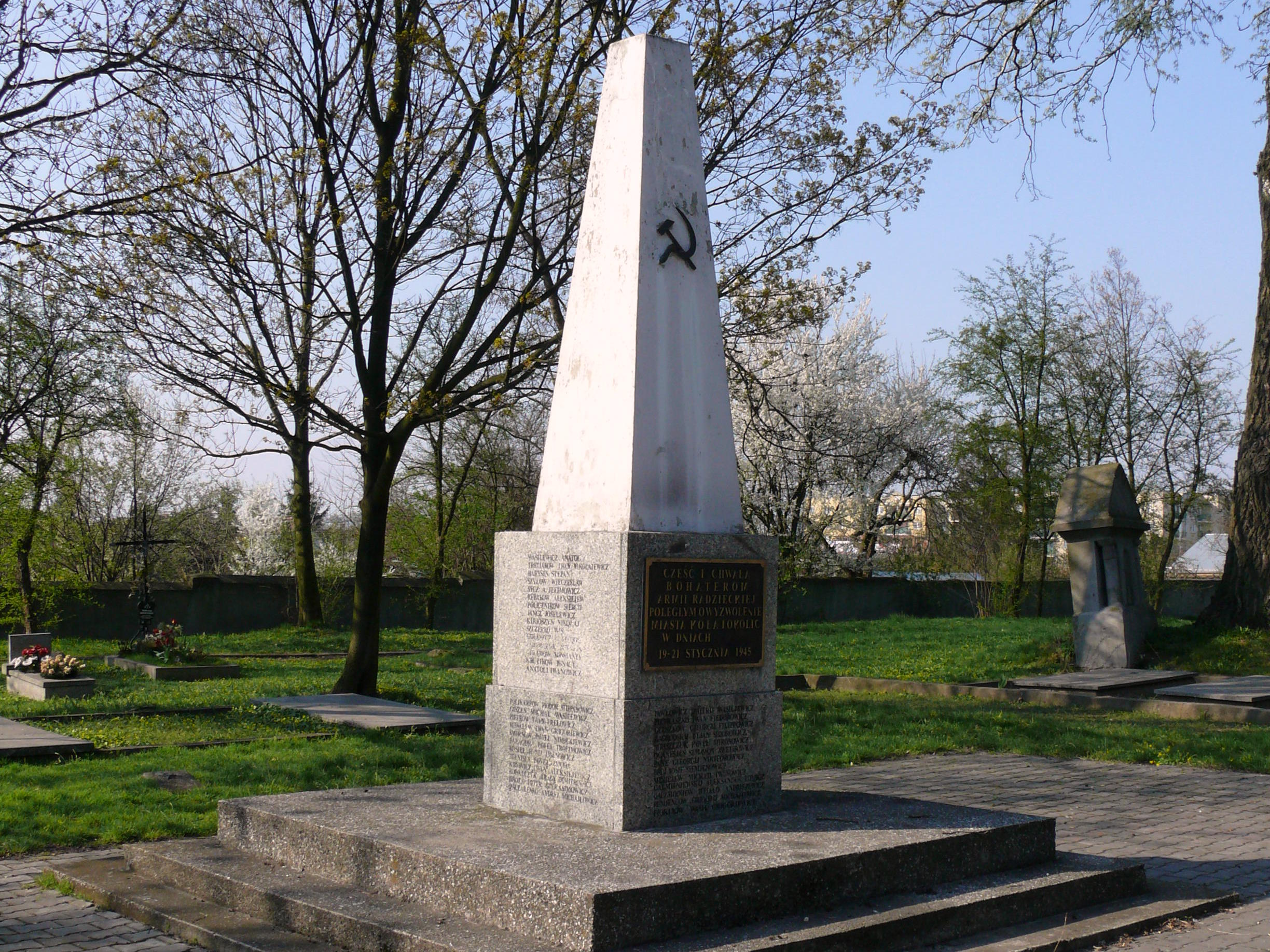
The Soviet monument with the hammer and sickle in place.

This is an obelisk an inscription which translates as "Honour and glory to the heroes of the Soviet Army, who died for the liberation of the town of Kolo and its surroundings on January 19-21, 1945" and the names of 132 killed in the battles for the town. It also originally bore a hammer and sickle. This was removed early in 2022 but reinstated in May that year, only for it to be stolen on 16 May.

== Bibliography (in Polish) ==
- Józef Burszta, 600 lat miasta Koła, Poznań 1963
- Mujta, Józef Stanisław (1997). 635 lat miasta Koła. Koło: Muzeum Technik Ceramicznych : Kolskie Towarzystwo Kulturalne. ISBN 83-86139-34-X.
- Kasperkiewicz, Kazimierz (2004). Miejsca i obiekty walki i pamięci z lat wojny i okupacji 1939-1945 w Kole i powiecie kolskim. Koło: Towarzystwo Przyjaciół Miasta Koła. ISBN 8390903091.
