= Ochle, Greater Poland Voivodeship =

Ochle
- Village
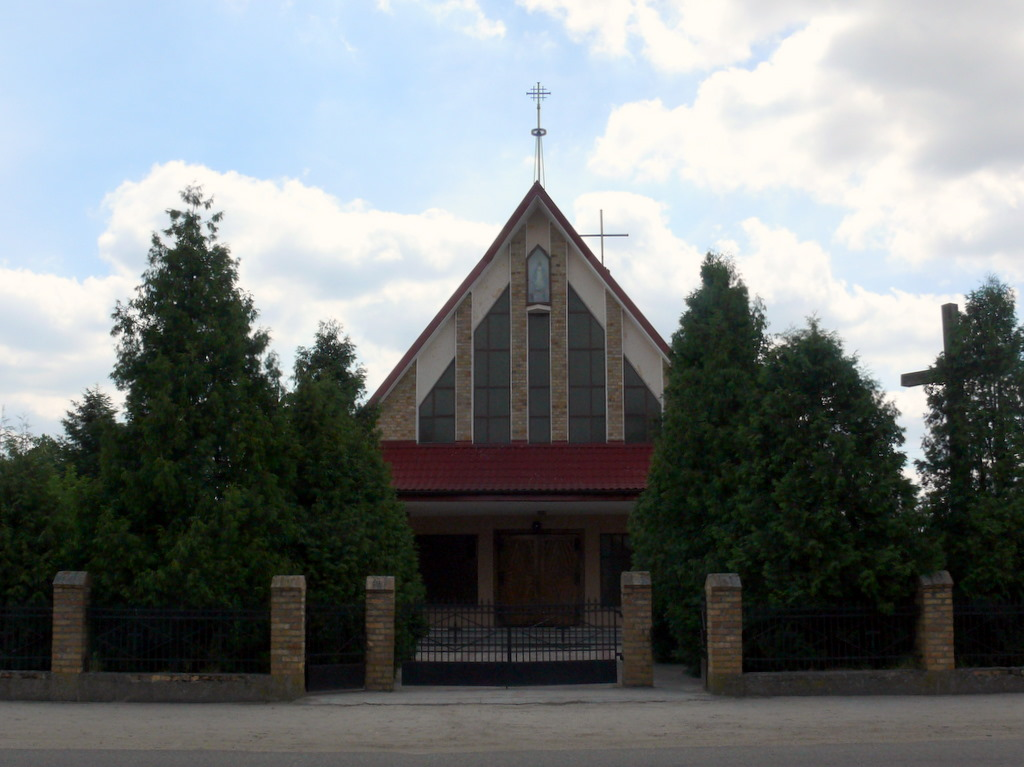
- Church of the Ascension in Ochle

- Location within Poland
- Coordinates: 52°13′N 18°36′E
- Country: Poland
- Voivodeship: Greater Poland
- County: Koło
- Gmina: Koło

Population
  - Total: 310
- Time zone: UTC+1 (CET)
  - Summer (DST): UTC+2 (CEST)
- Vehicle registration: PKL

Ochle [ˈɔxlɛ] is a village in the administrative district of Gmina Koło, within Koło County, Greater Poland Voivodeship, in central Poland.
