= Aleksandrówka, Greater Poland Voivodeship =

Aleksandrówka
- Village
- Location within Poland
- Coordinates: 52°14′29″N 18°38′22″E
- Country: Poland
- Voivodeship: Greater Poland
- County: Koło
- Gmina: Koło
- Population: 50
- Time zone: UTC+1 (CET)
  - Summer (DST): UTC+2 (CEST)
- Vehicle registration: PKL

Aleksandrówka [alɛksanˈdrufka] is a village in the administrative district of Gmina Koło, within Koło County, Greater Poland Voivodeship, in central Poland.
