= Leśnica, Greater Poland Voivodeship =

Leśnica
- Village
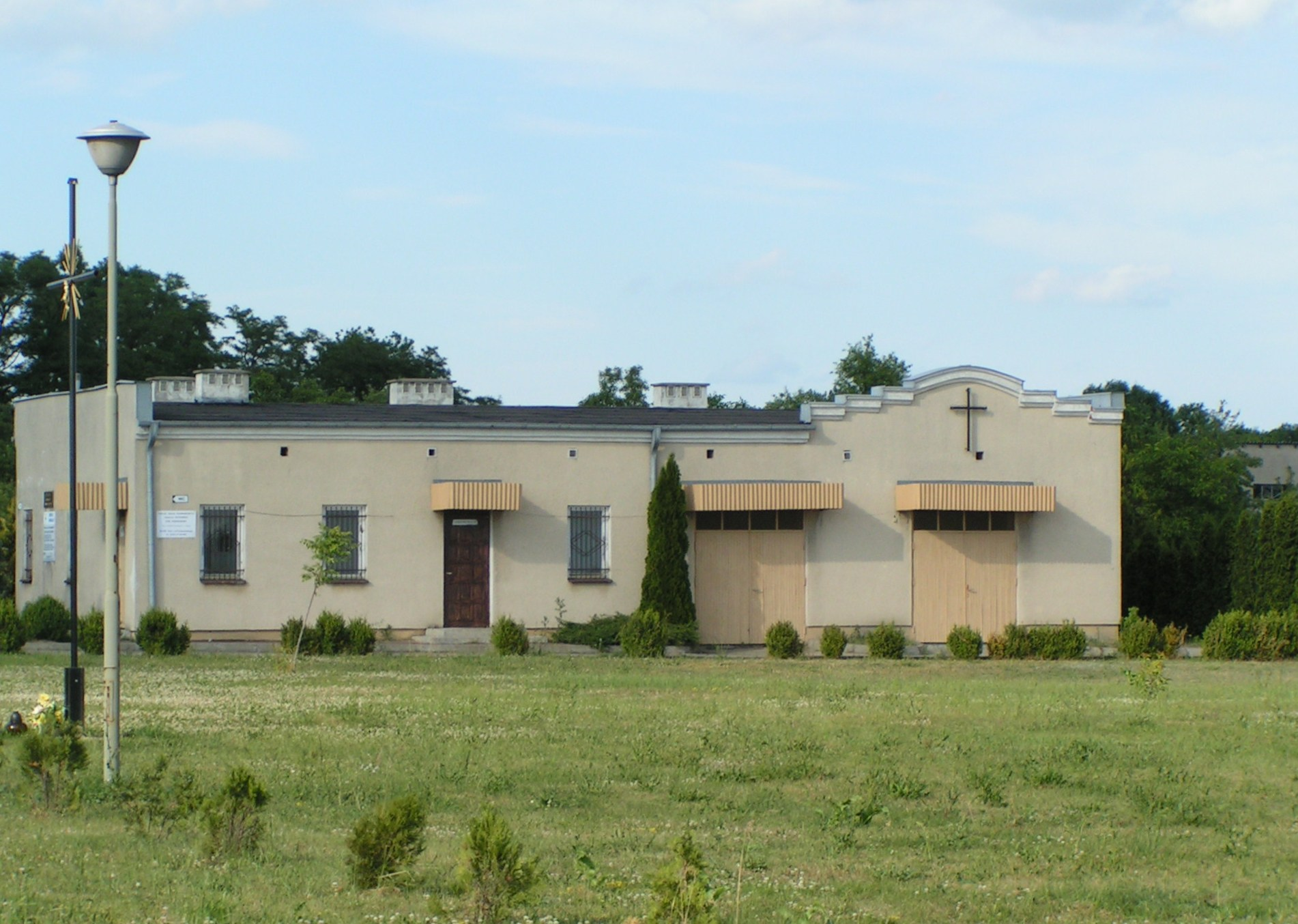

- Location within Poland
- Coordinates: 52°12′N 18°41′E
- Country: Poland
- Voivodeship: Greater Poland
- County: Koło
- Gmina: Koło

Population
  - Total: 250
- Time zone: UTC+1 (CET)
  - Summer (DST): UTC+2 (CEST)
- Vehicle registration: PKL

Leśnica [lɛɕˈnit͡sa] is a village in the administrative district of Gmina Koło, within Koło County, Greater Poland Voivodeship, in central Poland.
