= Kamień, Koło County =

Kamień
- Village
- Location within Poland
- Coordinates: 52°16′50″N 18°39′30″E
- Country: Poland
- Voivodeship: Greater Poland
- County: Koło
- Gmina: Koło
- Population: 270
- Time zone: UTC+1 (CET)
  - Summer (DST): UTC+2 (CEST)
- Vehicle registration: PKL

Kamień (Polish pronunciation: [ˈkamjɛj̃]) is a village in the administrative district of Gmina Koło, within Koło County, Greater Poland Voivodeship, in central Poland.
