= Czołowo-Kolonia =

- Village
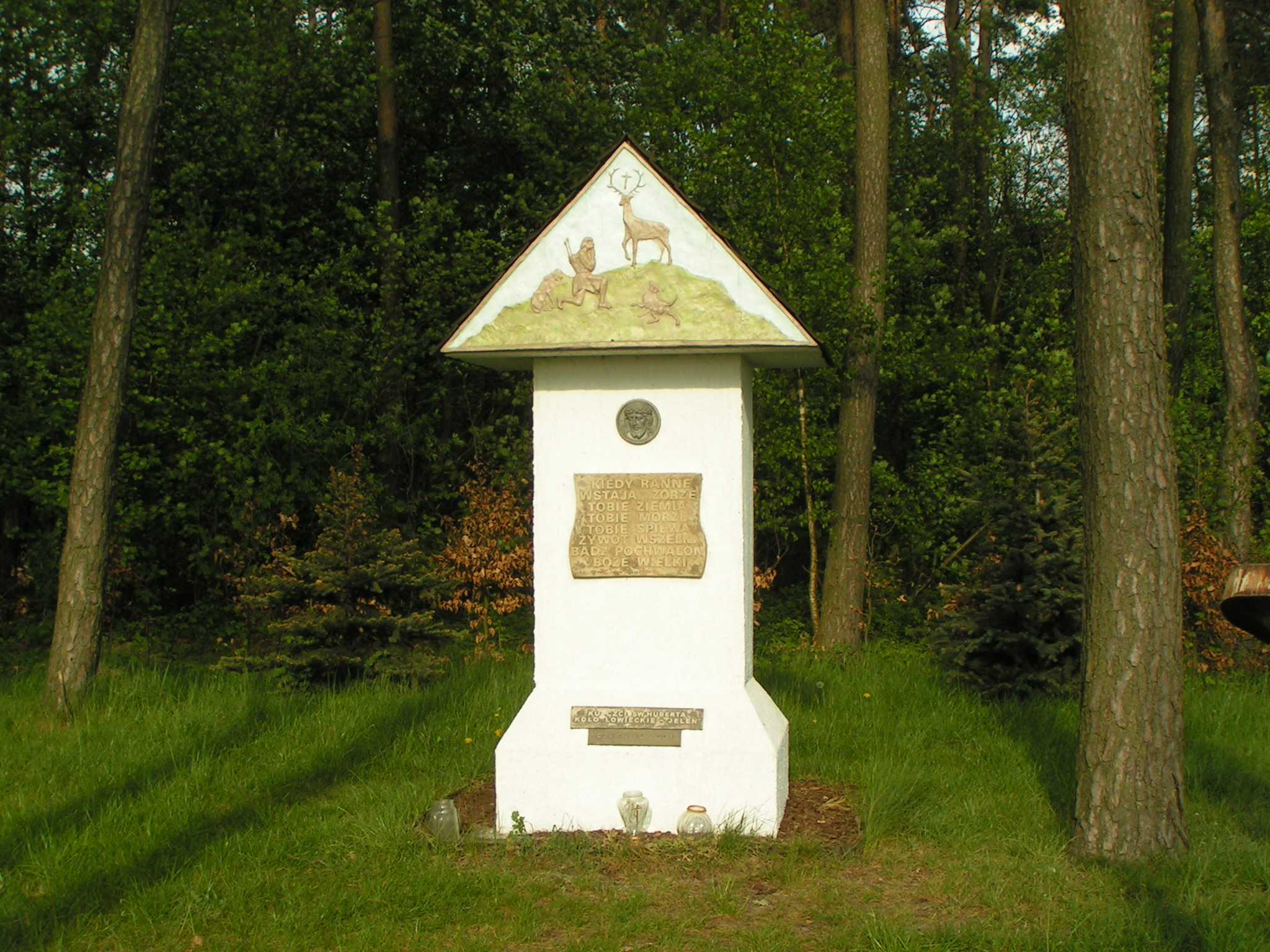
- Monument in Czołowo

- Location within Poland
- Coordinates: 52°15′06″N 18°38′31″E
- Country: Poland
- Voivodeship: Greater Poland
- County: Koło
- Gmina: Koło
- Population: 200
- Time zone: UTC+1 (CET)
  - Summer (DST): UTC+2 (CEST)
- Vehicle registration: PKL

Czołowo-Kolonia [t͡ʂɔˈwɔvɔ kɔˈlɔɲa] is a village in the administrative district of Gmina Koło, within Koło County, Greater Poland Voivodeship, in central Poland.
