= Kiełczew Smużny Pierwszy =

- Village
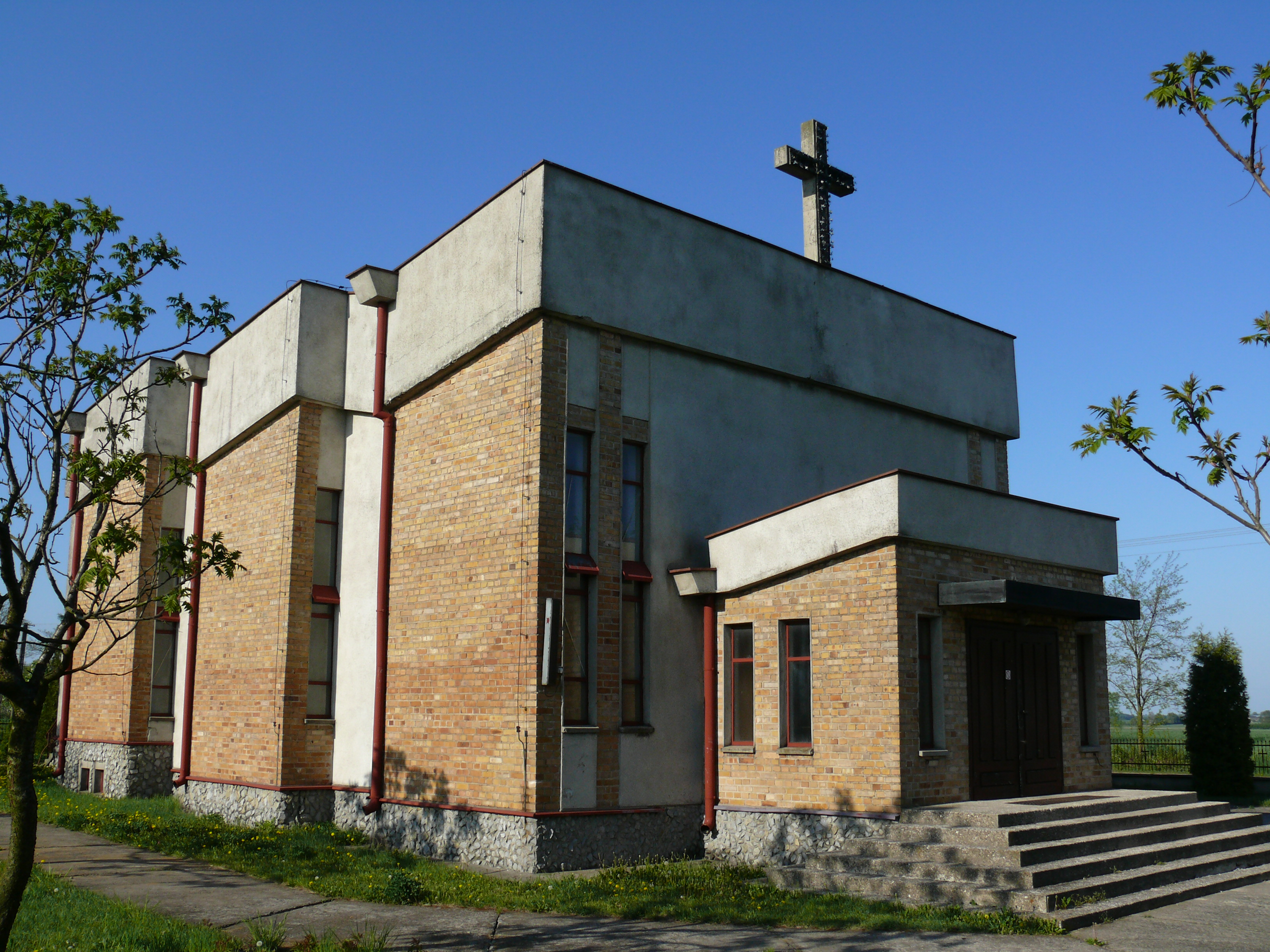
- Christ the Redemer of the World church in Kiełczew Smużny Pierwszy

- Location within Poland
- Coordinates: 52°16′N 18°44′E
- Country: Poland
- Voivodeship: Greater Poland
- County: Koło
- Gmina: Koło

Population
  - Total: 210
- Time zone: UTC+1 (CET)
  - Summer (DST): UTC+2 (CEST)
- Vehicle registration: PKL

Kiełczew Smużny Pierwszy [ˈkʲɛu̯t͡ʂɛf ˈsmuʐnɨ ˈpjɛrfʂɨ] is a village in the administrative district of Gmina Koło, within Koło County, Greater Poland Voivodeship, in central Poland.
