= Czołowo, Koło County =

Czołowo
- Village
- Location within Poland
- Coordinates: 52°15′N 18°40′E
- Country: Poland
- Voivodeship: Greater Poland
- County: Koło
- Gmina: Koło
- Population: 230
- Time zone: UTC+1 (CET)
  - Summer (DST): UTC+2 (CEST)
- Vehicle registration: PKL

Czołowo [t͡ʂɔˈwɔvɔ] is a village in the administrative district of Gmina Koło, within Koło County, Greater Poland Voivodeship, in central Poland.
