= Dzierawy =

- Village
- Wayside shrine in Dzierawy

- Location within Poland
- Coordinates: 52°13′N 18°35′E
- Country: Poland
- Voivodeship: Greater Poland
- County: Koło
- Gmina: Koło

Population
  - Total: 340
- Time zone: UTC+1 (CET)
  - Summer (DST): UTC+2 (CEST)
- Vehicle registration: PKL

Dzierawy [d͡ʑɛˈravɨ] is a village in the administrative district of Gmina Koło, within Koło County, Greater Poland Voivodeship, in central Poland.
