= Wrząca Wielka, Greater Poland Voivodeship =

Wrząca Wielka
- Village
- Parish church of Saint James, built 1888

- Location within Poland
- Coordinates: 52°15′38″N 18°40′42″E
- Country: Poland
- Voivodeship: Greater Poland
- County: Koło
- Gmina: Koło
- Population: 480
- Time zone: UTC+1 (CET)
  - Summer (DST): UTC+2 (CEST)
- Vehicle registration: PKL

Wrząca Wielka [ˈvʐɔnt͡sa ˈvjɛlka] is a village in the administrative district of Gmina Koło, within Koło County, Greater Poland Voivodeship, in central Poland.
