= K-dron =

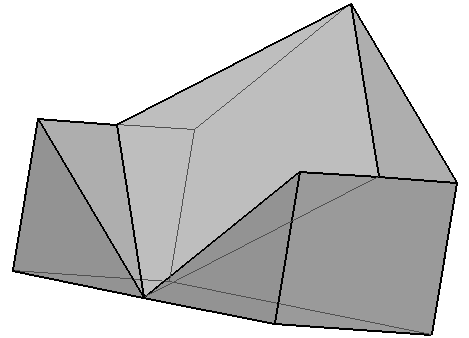
K-dron

A K-dron net diagram

A k-dron is an eleven-sided polyhedron discovered by Polish architect and designer Janusz Kapusta in 1985. The shape was invented while preparing for an exhibition with his colleague in a New York gallery. After printing the leaflets promoting the exhibition, which featured the image of two squares typed one in the other, Janusz Kapusta fell into the spatial form, based on which he then made a spatial model of the solid.

The K-dron's surface has a rhombus with attached right triangles and a square base. Two K-drons, placed tops together, form a cube. Professor Janusz Łysko of Widener University found an expression in two variables whose graph is the upper surface of a k-dron, within the bounds of −1 ≤ x ≤ 1 and −1 ≤ y ≤ 1, namely: $f(x,y)= \frac {1}{2} \cdot (|y-x+1|-|y-x-1|+|y+x+1|-|y+x-1|-|x-1|-|x+1|)+|y-1|.$

K-dron systems can be arranged a great many different ways, creating a great variety of light and shadow patterns. As the angle of incidence changes, new patterns are created.

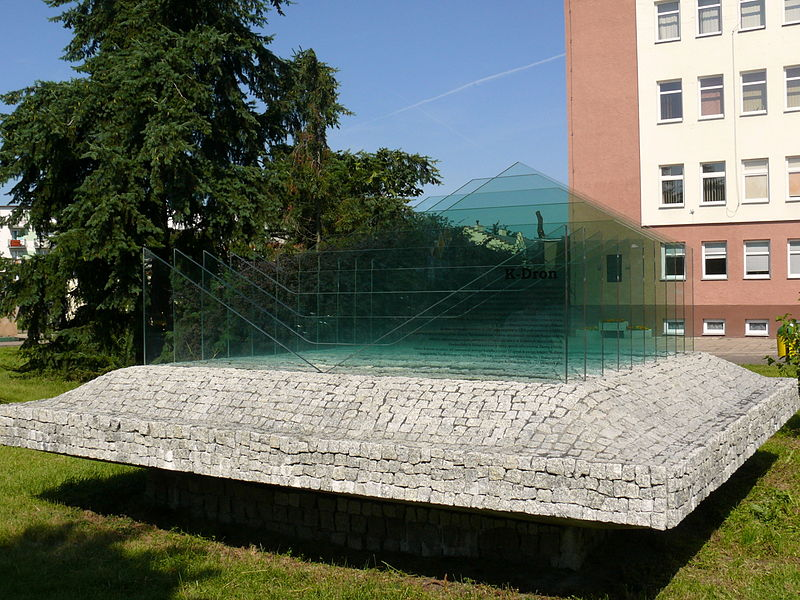
A monument to the K-dron in Koło

K-dron is used to design architectural buildings and arts in sculpture and painting. There are an extreme variety of applications for this body – Janusz Kapusta described 50 applications in his book, and in April 2001 he stated he already found 168.

In 2009 the k-dron monument was erected before the building of the county seat in Koło.
