= Warsaw Bridgehead =

The Warsaw Bridgehead (German: Brückenkopf Warschau; Polish: Przedmoście Warszawskie or Przedmoście Warszawa) is a line of fortifications east of Warsaw, stretching from the Rynia on the Narew River, running through Struga, Zielonka, Stara Miłosna, Wiązowna and Józefów, and ending at the Vistula River. It was first begun in 1915 and was rebuilt many times up until 1944. Most of it has been destroyed, though a few of its forts remain partially buried.

== Design ==
=== Russian plan ===
Diagram of the Warsaw Fortified Region, with the eastern border secured by Fort Beniaminów, Fort Maciołki (never built), Fort Pustelniki (never built), Fort Kawęczyn and Fort Wawer

=== German plan ===
Map showing the summer 1915 German offensive, which led to the forts of the Warsaw Fortified Region being occupied.

== World War I fortifications ==
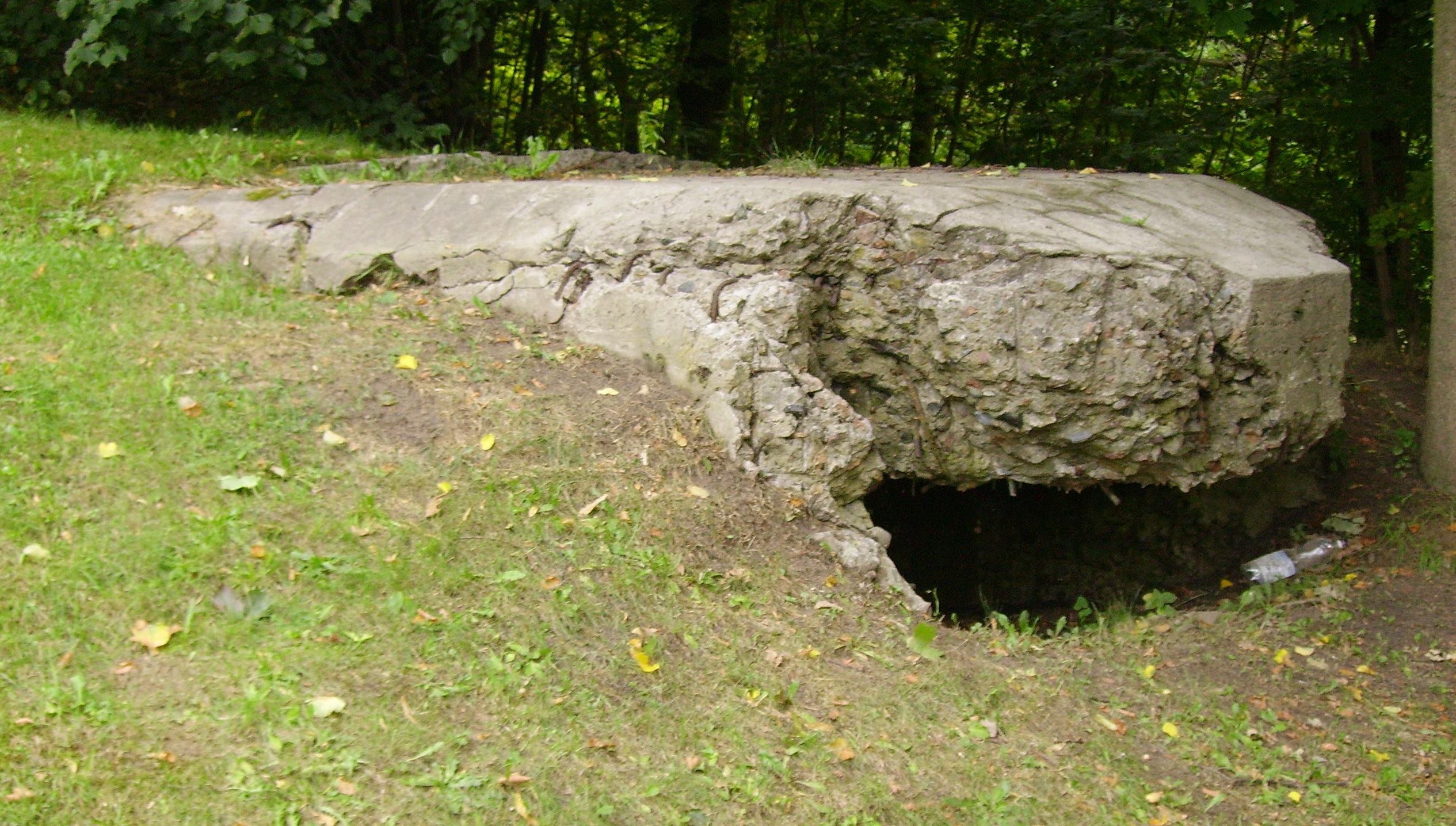
Battle shelter at Wiązowna.

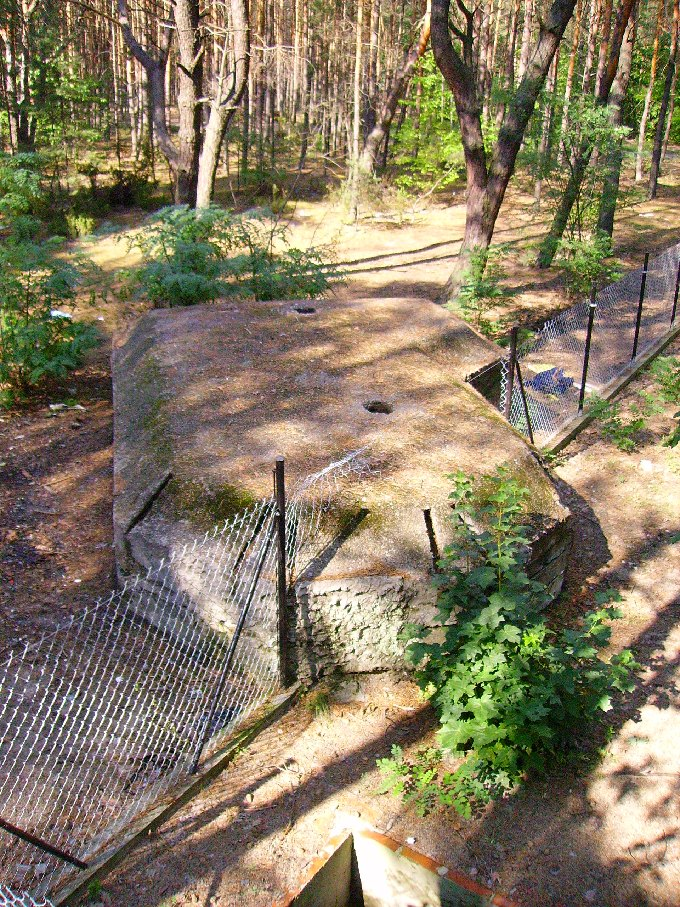
Observation post, Józefów.

== Polish-Bolshevik War ==
=== Preparing defensive positions ===
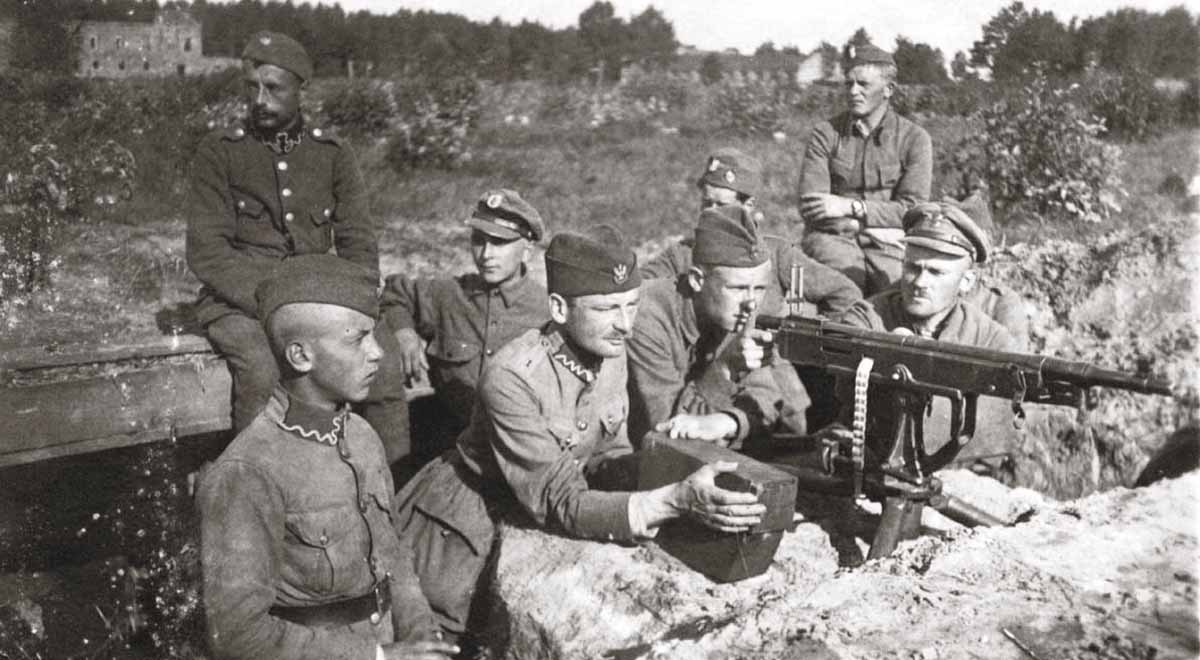
Polish M1895 Colt–Browning machine gun post near Miłosną, August 1920.

== 1940–1944 construction ==
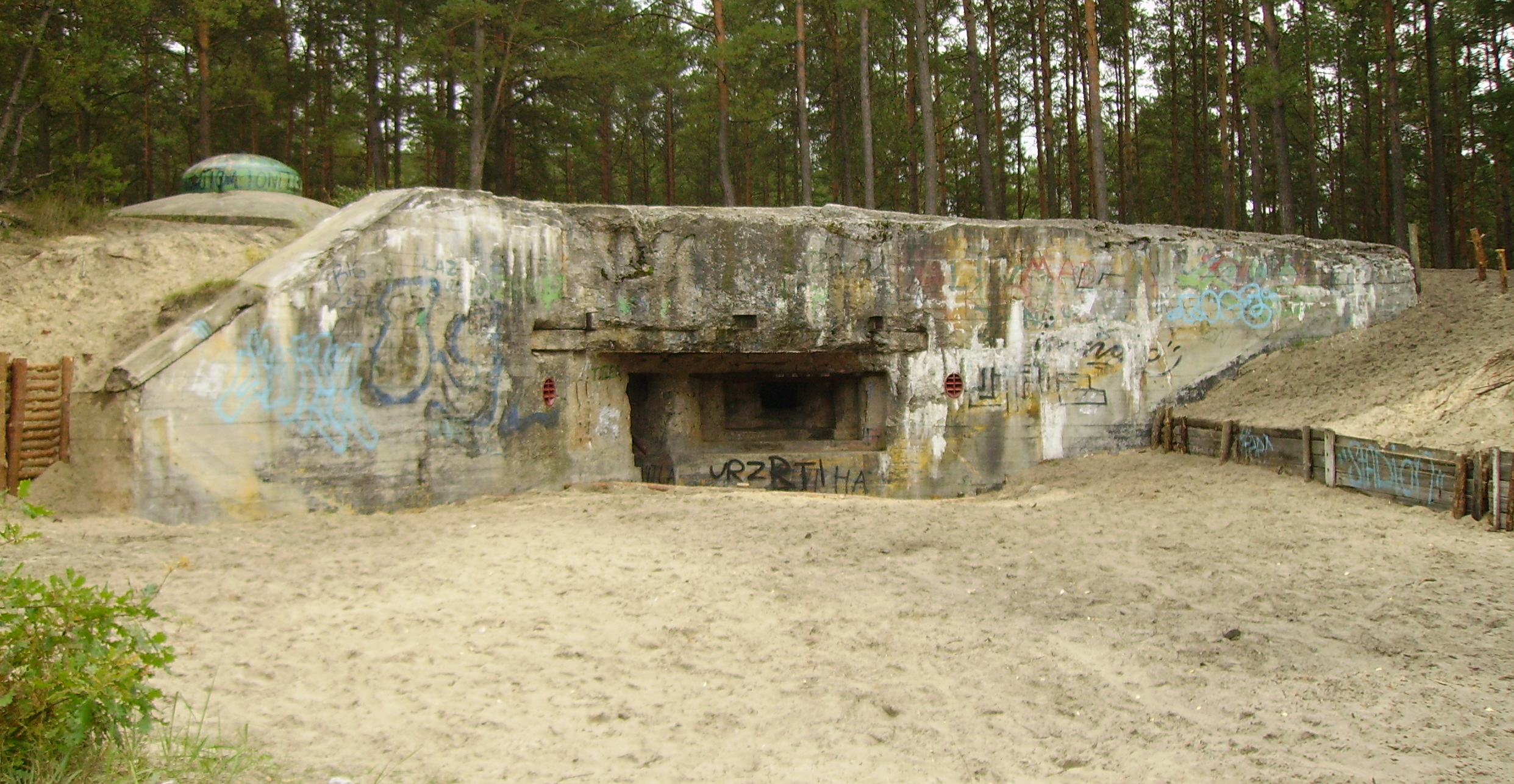
Regelbau 120a type shelter, Dąbrowiecka Góra

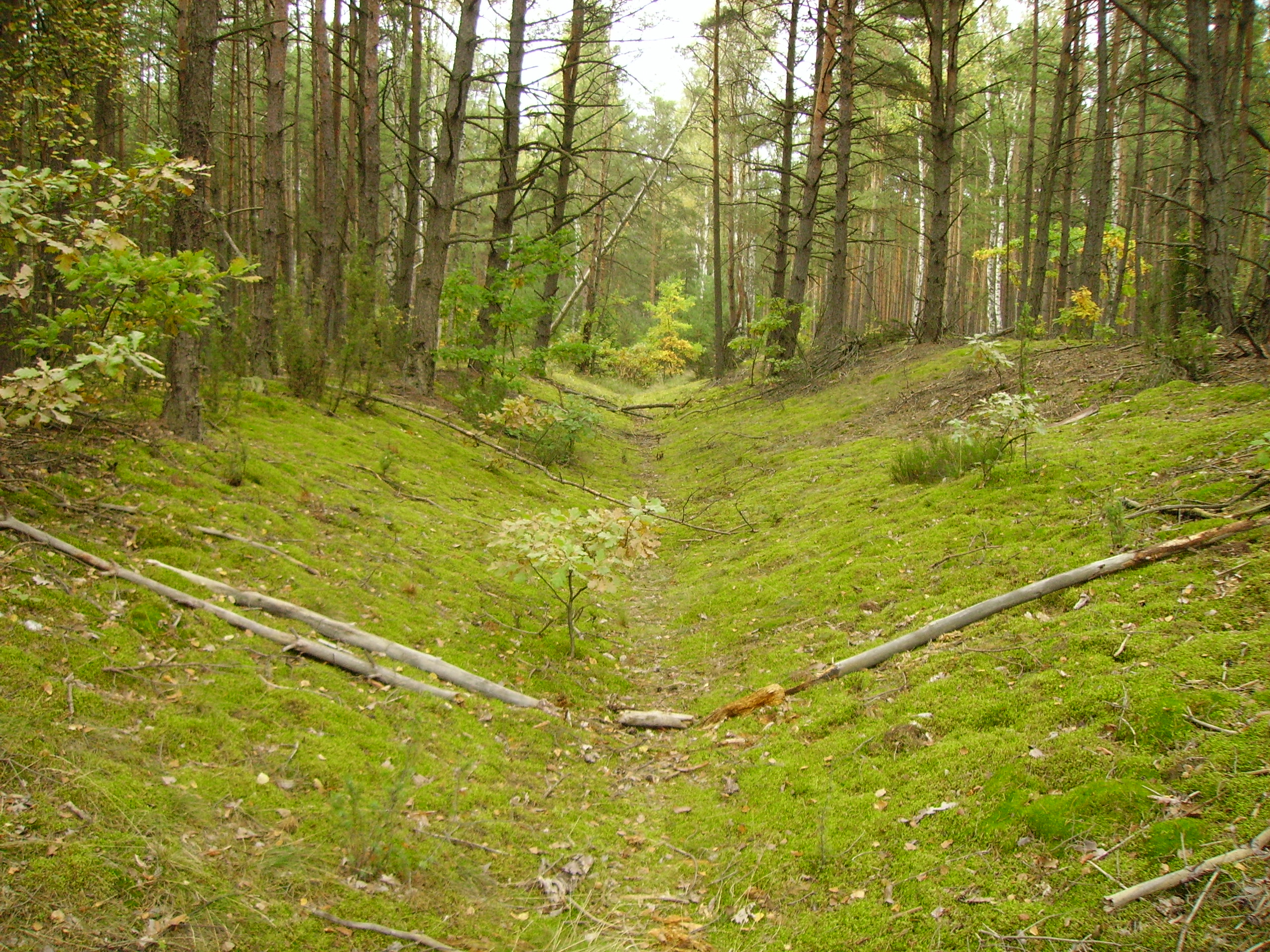
Fragment of an anti-tank ditch, Dąbrowiecka Góra

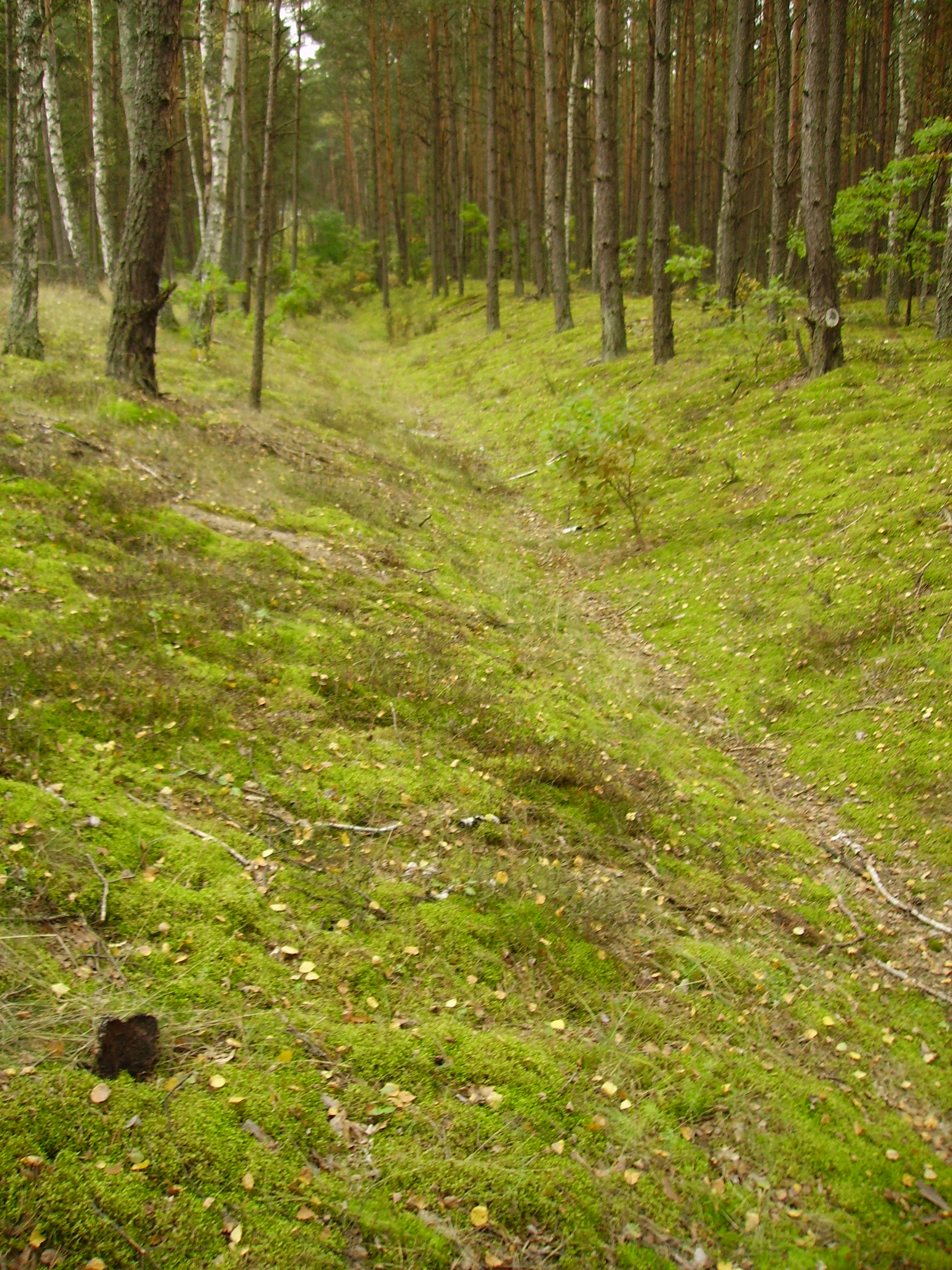
Fragment of another anti-tank ditch, Dąbrowiecka Góra

== Fighting in 1944 ==
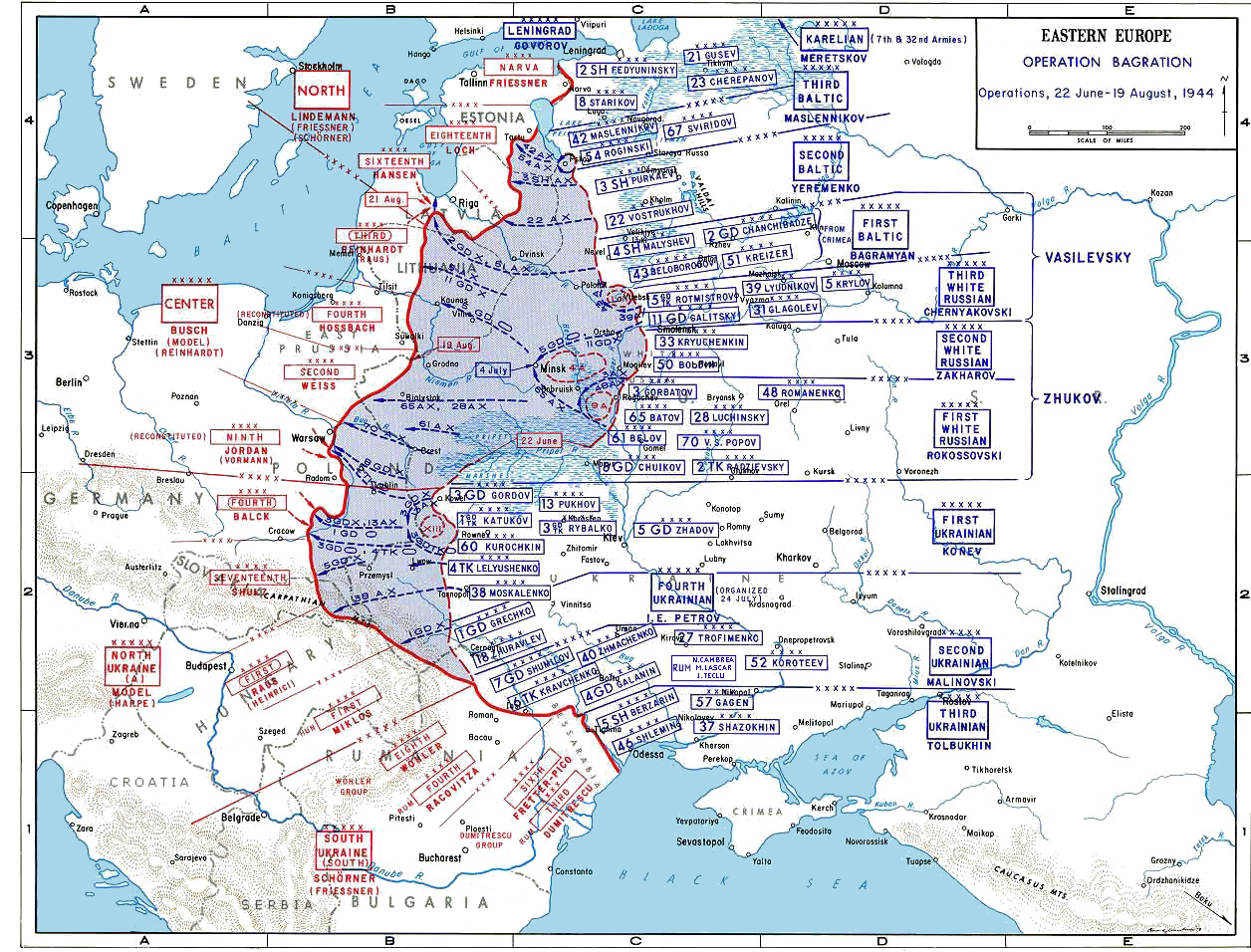
German and Soviet troops in Operation Bagration.

== Bibliography (in Polish) ==
- Ajdacki Paweł (2007). Przedmoście Warszawskie. PTTK Oddział Otwock.
- Pokropiński Bogdan (2004). Kolej jabłonowska. Warszawskie Koleje Dojazdowe. Wydawnictwo Komunikacji i Łączności. ISBN 83-20-61513-5.
