= Koło =

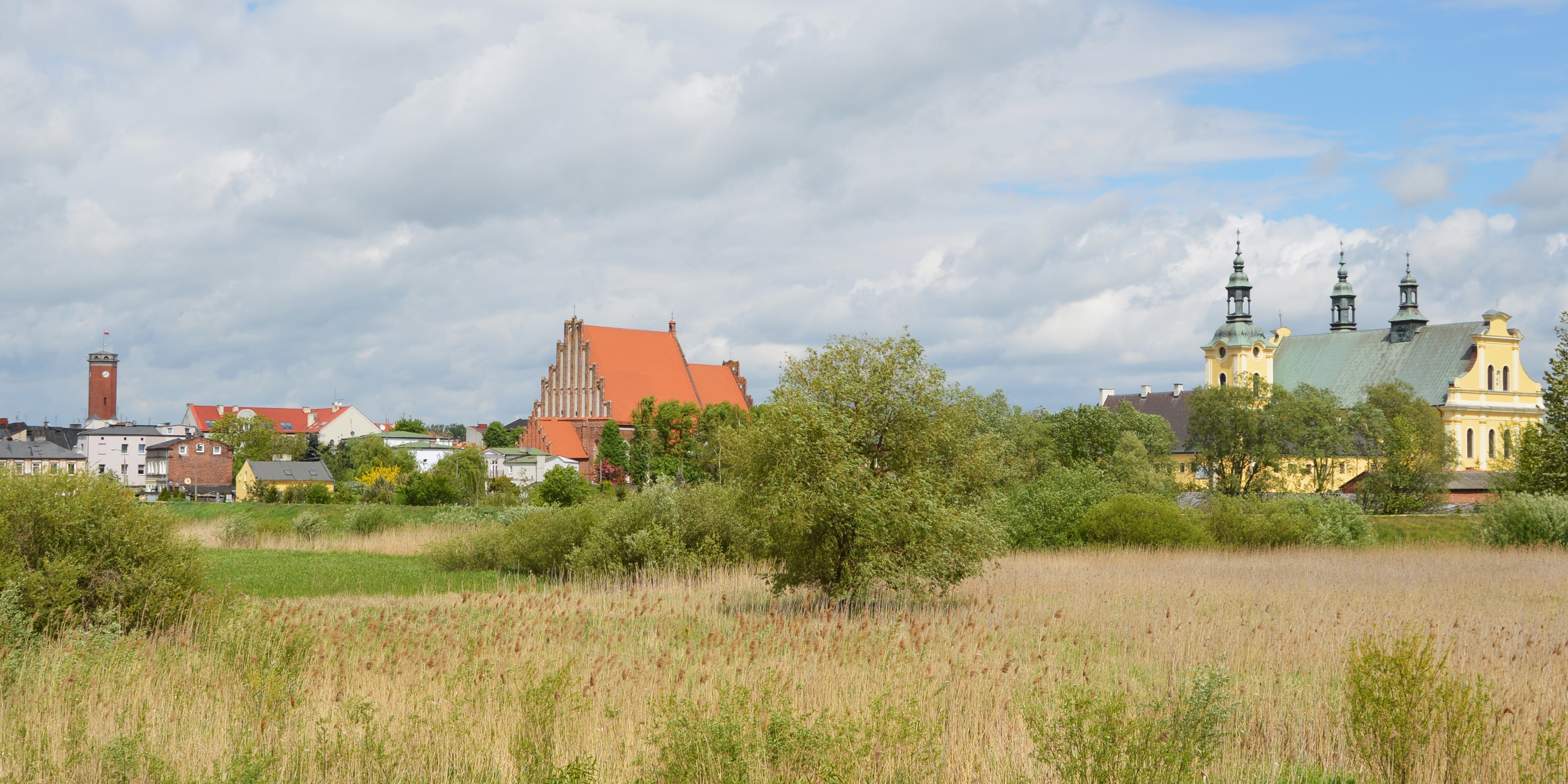
- Skyline of Koło

- Flag Coat of arms

- Location within Poland
- Coordinates: 52°12′N 18°38′E
- Country: Poland
- Voivodeship: Greater Poland
- County: Koło
- Gmina: Koło (urban gmina)
- Established: 13th century
- Town rights: 1362

Government
  - Mayor: Krzysztof Witkowski

Area
  - Total: 13.85 km^{2} (5.35 sq mi)
- Elevation: 110 m (360 ft)

Population (2006)
  - Total: 23,034
  - Density: 1,663/km^{2} (4,307/sq mi)
- Time zone: UTC+1 (CET)
  - Summer (DST): UTC+2 (CEST)
- Postal code: 62-600 to 62-602
- Area code: +48 63
- Climate: Dfb
- Car plates: PKL
- Website: http://www.kolo.pl

Koło (Polish pronunciation: [ˈkɔwɔ]) is a town on the Warta River in central Poland with 23,101 inhabitants (2006). It is situated in the Greater Poland Voivodship and it is the capital of Koło County.

== History ==
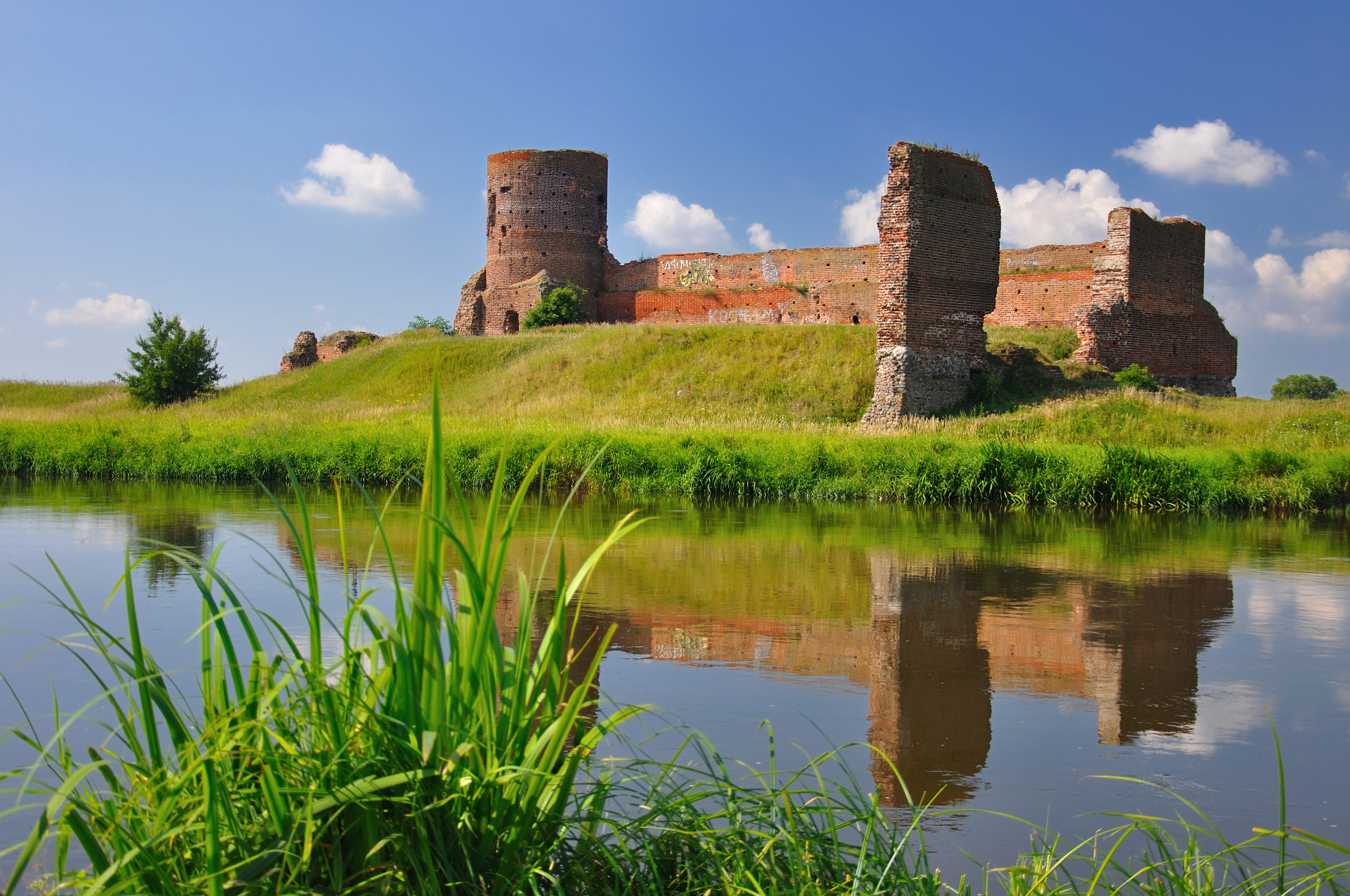
Gothic Koło Castle, built in the 14th century on the river Warta

Koło is one of the oldest towns in Poland. It was granted town status in 1362 by King Casimir III. It was situated in a safe place near the royal castle, on the island in the branches of the Warta River; the town had no walls but only two gates. It was a royal city and the seat of a land county (starostwo niegrodowe).^{[p. 16–18]}

In 1410 Koło was a gathering place of the Greater Poland nobility, which called for a war with the Teutonic Order (see Battle of Grunwald). In 1452 the Royal Castle in Koło was the place of meeting between King Casimir the Jagiellonian and the representatives of the Prussian Union (see: the Thirteen Years' War).

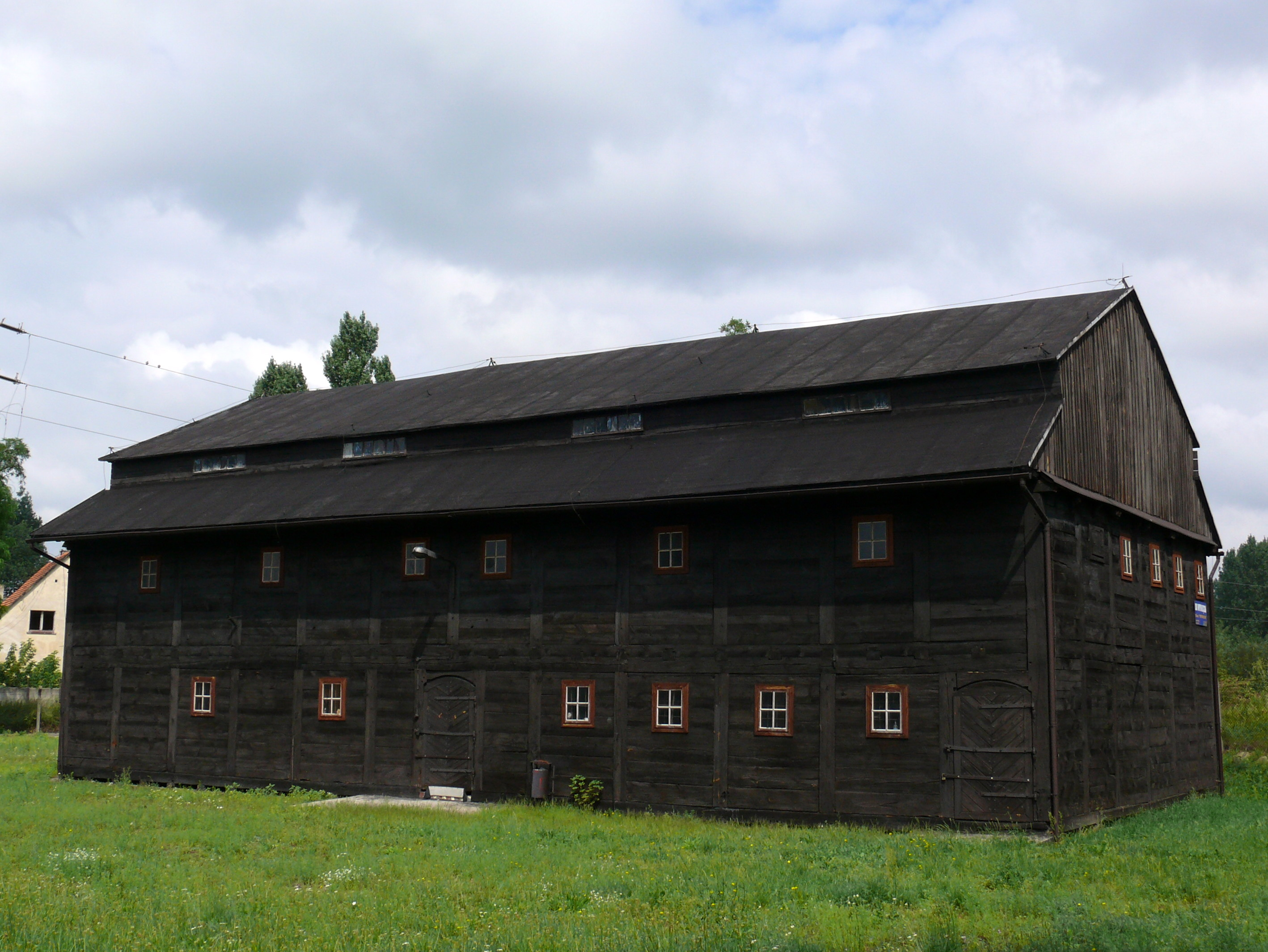
Preserved old wooden granary

From the early 15th century until 1716, Koło was the meeting place of the Provincial Parliament called Sejmik Generalny for the Greater Poland region, comprising the Poznań Voivodship, Kalisz, Sieradz, Łęczyca, Brześć Kujawski and Inowrocław Voivodeships. The town evolved into a regional hub of trade and crafts especially in metals and textiles, and as a centre of pottery. In 1571 a contract was drafted with regard to the status of the Jews in Koło, in which the city's Christians have undertaken to provide protection to the Jews, in return for which the Jews were required pay a special annual municipal tax.

Koło was destroyed twice, once in 1622 by the Lisowski forces, and in 1655 by the Swedes; the economy managed to revive only at the end of the 17th century. Until 1793 Koło belonged to Konin County of the Kalisz Voivodeship of the Greater Poland Province. The 1st Polish National Cavalry Brigade was stationed in the town. Following the Second Partition of Poland, in the years 1793-1806 it was occupied by Prussia, but during the Kościuszko Uprising in 1794 it was temporarily liberated by the insurgents. After the successful Greater Poland uprising of 1806, it was regained by Poles and included within the short-lived Duchy of Warsaw. After the duchy's dissolution in 1815, it formed part of Russian-controlled Congress Poland. In 1826, Fryderyk Chopin travelled through the town.

=== 20th century ===
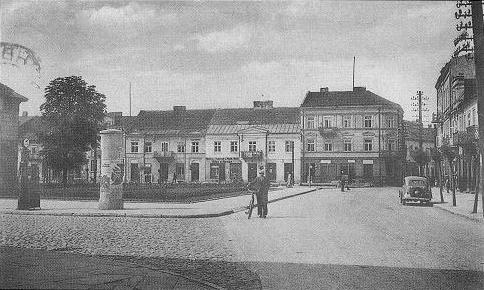
Stary Rynek ("Old Market Square") in the 1920s

After the return of Poland's sovereignty at the end of World War I, Koło was assigned to Łódź Voivodeship. A new railway line opened in 1921 from Kutno to Strzałkowo via Koło. According to the 1921 census, the population was 58.7% Polish and 40.2% Jewish. In 1924 it formally subsumed the local villages of Nagórna and Blizna.

On September 2, 1939, during Nazi Germany's invasion of Poland, the Luftwaffe bombed a civilian evacuation train from Krotoszyn, killing almost 250 civilians. The Germans captured Koło on September 18, 1939. On September 19, Jewish males over the age of 14 were rounded up and sent to forced labour. The Jewish synagogue was set on fire the following day. Many Poles were arrested and imprisoned in the local prison, and afterwards murdered in Rzuchów. On November 11, 1939, 80 people, who had previously been imprisoned in Koło, were murdered there by the German police. In November 1939, Poles from Koło were also murdered in other places, including Bugaj, Chełmno nad Nerem, Konin.

The first Aktion, conducted by Wehrmacht soldiers and gendarmes, took place in December 1939, in which 100 Jews were executed. In June 1940 the Germans expelled 514 Poles, merchants and craftsmen with entire families, mostly to the General Government, while some were deported to forced labour to Germany, and their houses, workshops and shops were handed over to German colonists in accordance to the Nazi Lebensraum policy. In December 1940, the Jews were rounded up in a ghetto, which was liquidated the following year, in December 1941. The remaining Jews were deported to Chełmno extermination camp, where they were killed in gas vans and buried in mass graves. Koło remained a transfer point for Jews deported to Łódź, and Nazi officials, including Heinrich Himmler, visited the town.

Under German occupation, the town was renamed to Wartbrücken in 1940, and then to Warthbrücken in 1941 (which translates to "bridge on Warta river").

From 1975 to 1998, it was administratively part of the Konin Voivodship.

== Climate ==
The climate is oceanic (Köppen: Cfb), but using older data and the modified Trewartha classification the climate would be continental (Dc).

Climate data for Koło, elevation: 102 m or 335 ft, 1991–2020 normals, extremes 1951–2020
Month	Jan	Feb	Mar	Apr	May	Jun	Jul	Aug	Sep	Oct	Nov	Dec	Year
Record high °C (°F)	13.8 (56.8)	17.1 (62.8)	23.4 (74.1)	30.4 (86.7)	31.9 (89.4)	36.9 (98.4)	38.4 (101.1)	36.7 (98.1)	32.9 (91.2)	26.7 (80.1)	19.3 (66.7)	15.9 (60.6)	38.4 (101.1)
Mean maximum °C (°F)	9.0 (48.2)	10.6 (51.1)	16.8 (62.2)	23.8 (74.8)	27.3 (81.1)	31.4 (88.5)	32.7 (90.9)	32.4 (90.3)	26.8 (80.2)	21.5 (70.7)	14.6 (58.3)	9.7 (49.5)	34.5 (94.1)
Mean daily maximum °C (°F)	1.5 (34.7)	3.2 (37.8)	7.7 (45.9)	14.6 (58.3)	19.5 (67.1)	22.8 (73.0)	25.1 (77.2)	24.9 (76.8)	19.2 (66.6)	13.2 (55.8)	6.9 (44.4)	2.8 (37.0)	13.5 (56.3)
Daily mean °C (°F)	−1.0 (30.2)	0.1 (32.2)	3.5 (38.3)	9.2 (48.6)	13.9 (57.0)	17.3 (63.1)	19.4 (66.9)	19.1 (66.4)	14.1 (57.4)	9.0 (48.2)	4.1 (39.4)	0.4 (32.7)	9.1 (48.4)
Mean daily minimum °C (°F)	−3.3 (26.1)	−2.5 (27.5)	0.1 (32.2)	4.2 (39.6)	8.6 (47.5)	12.0 (53.6)	14.1 (57.4)	14.0 (57.2)	9.8 (49.6)	5.7 (42.3)	1.8 (35.2)	−1.8 (28.8)	5.2 (41.4)
Mean minimum °C (°F)	−13.8 (7.2)	−11.0 (12.2)	−6.8 (19.8)	−2.4 (27.7)	1.8 (35.2)	6.4 (43.5)	9.0 (48.2)	8.4 (47.1)	3.6 (38.5)	−1.7 (28.9)	−5.8 (21.6)	−10.5 (13.1)	−16.9 (1.6)
Record low °C (°F)	−28.6 (−19.5)	−26.6 (−15.9)	−21.2 (−6.2)	−7.8 (18.0)	−3.7 (25.3)	0.7 (33.3)	3.3 (37.9)	3.7 (38.7)	−1.7 (28.9)	−7.9 (17.8)	−16.9 (1.6)	−24.4 (−11.9)	−28.6 (−19.5)
Average precipitation mm (inches)	28.6 (1.13)	26.3 (1.04)	34.8 (1.37)	28.9 (1.14)	57.1 (2.25)	57.6 (2.27)	80.7 (3.18)	57.4 (2.26)	49.8 (1.96)	37.4 (1.47)	35.2 (1.39)	32.2 (1.27)	526.0 (20.71)
Average extreme snow depth cm (inches)	5.2 (2.0)	5.0 (2.0)	3.1 (1.2)	1.1 (0.4)	0.0 (0.0)	0.0 (0.0)	0.0 (0.0)	0.0 (0.0)	0.0 (0.0)	0.1 (0.0)	2.3 (0.9)	4.2 (1.7)	5.2 (2.0)
Average precipitation days (≥ 0.1 mm)	15.53	13.48	13.63	11.05	12.83	12.78	13.25	11.73	11.60	12.90	14.07	16.00	158.86
Average snowy days (≥ 0 cm)	13.8	12.8	5.7	0.7	0.0	0.0	0.0	0.0	0.0	0.1	2.6	9.7	45.4
Average relative humidity (%)	87.1	83.9	78.2	70.0	71.0	71.5	71.8	70.9	78.2	83.9	89.3	88.9	77.0
Mean monthly sunshine hours	49.1	69.4	127.9	197.6	250.9	247.9	254.2	247.3	162.2	110.5	49.1	38.8	1,805.1
Source 1: Institute of Meteorology and Water Management
Source 2: Meteomodel.pl (records, relative humidity 1991–2020)

== Sports ==
Sights of Koło (examples)

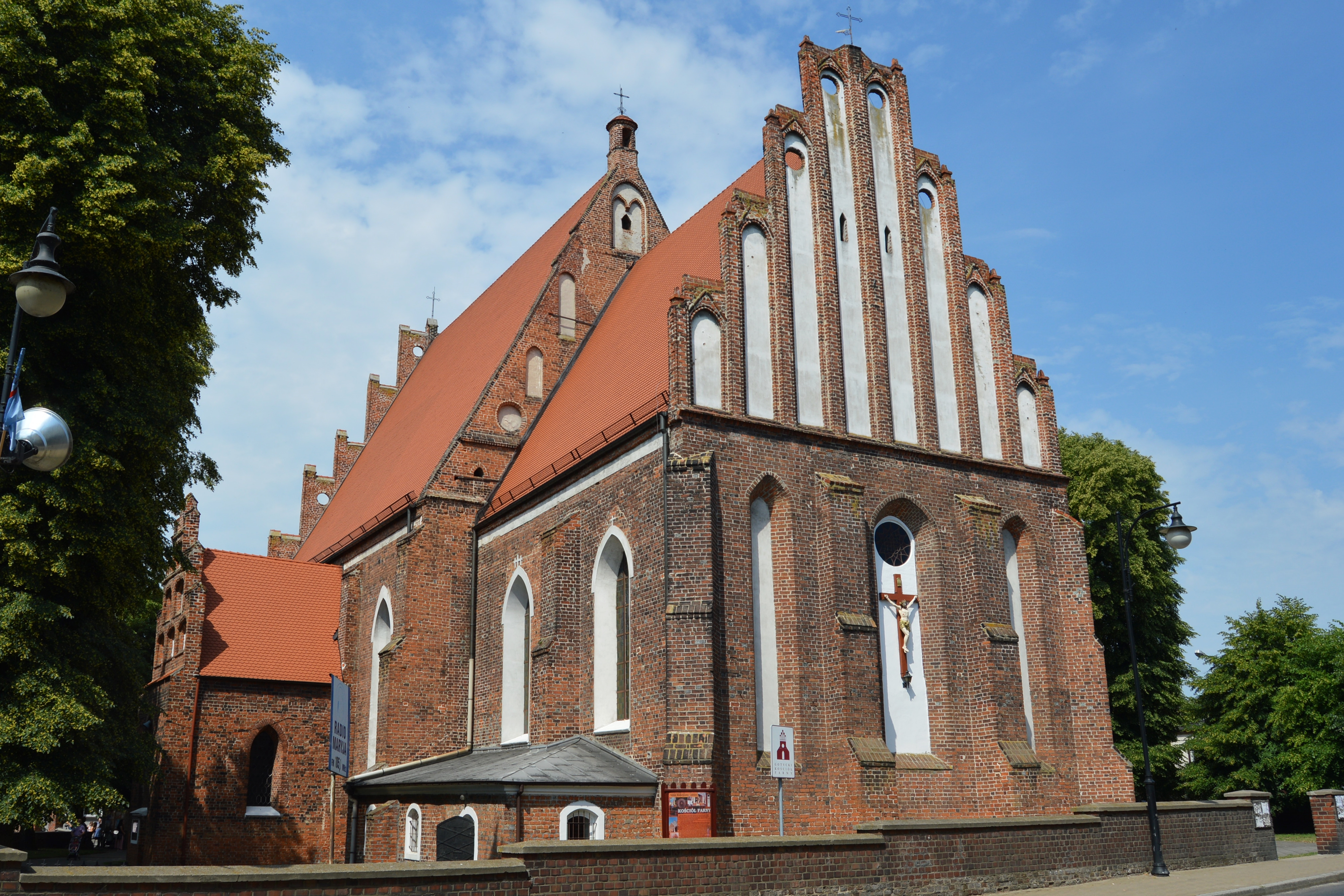
Gothic Exaltation of the Holy Cross church

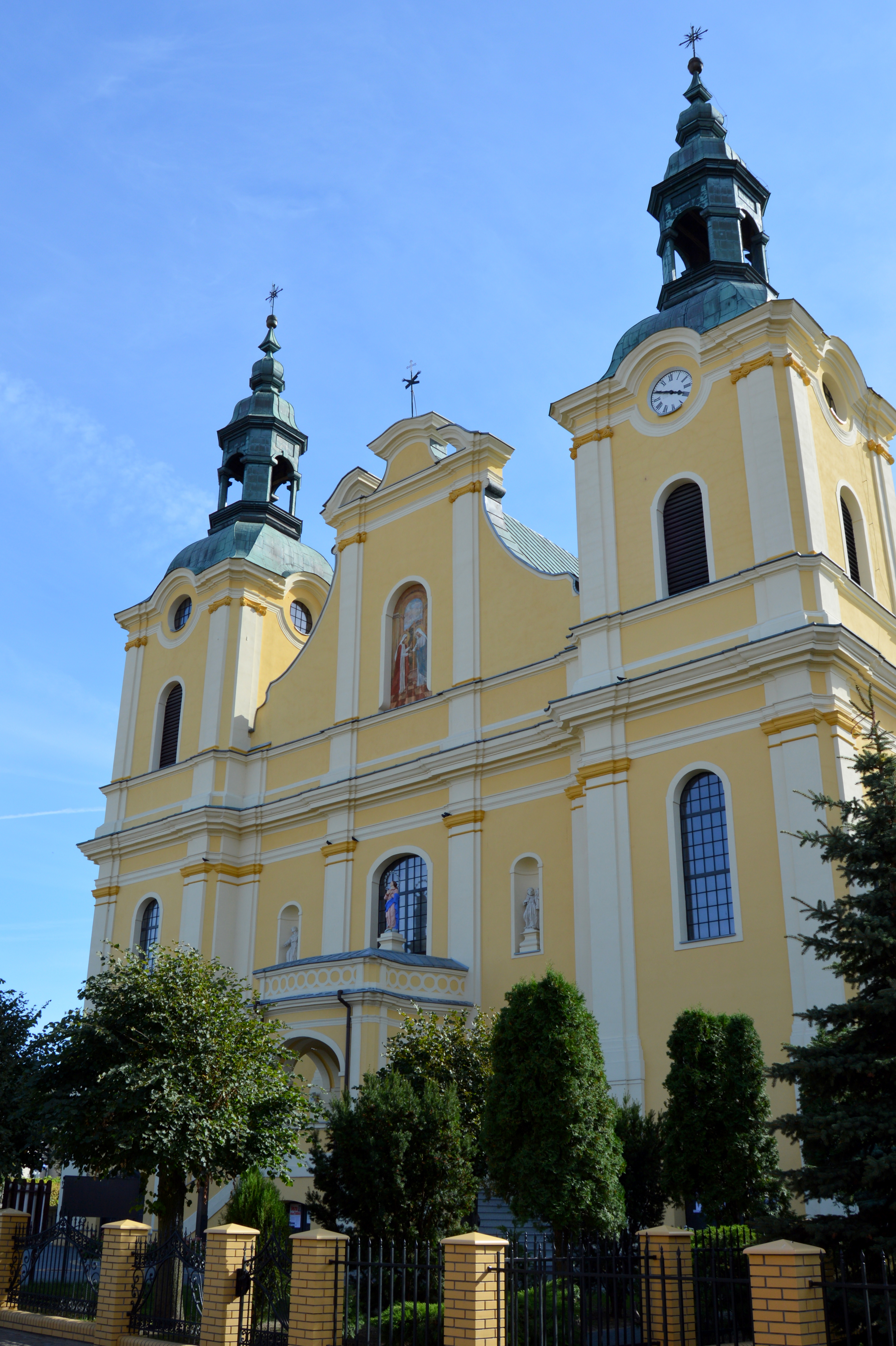
Baroque Church of the Visitation

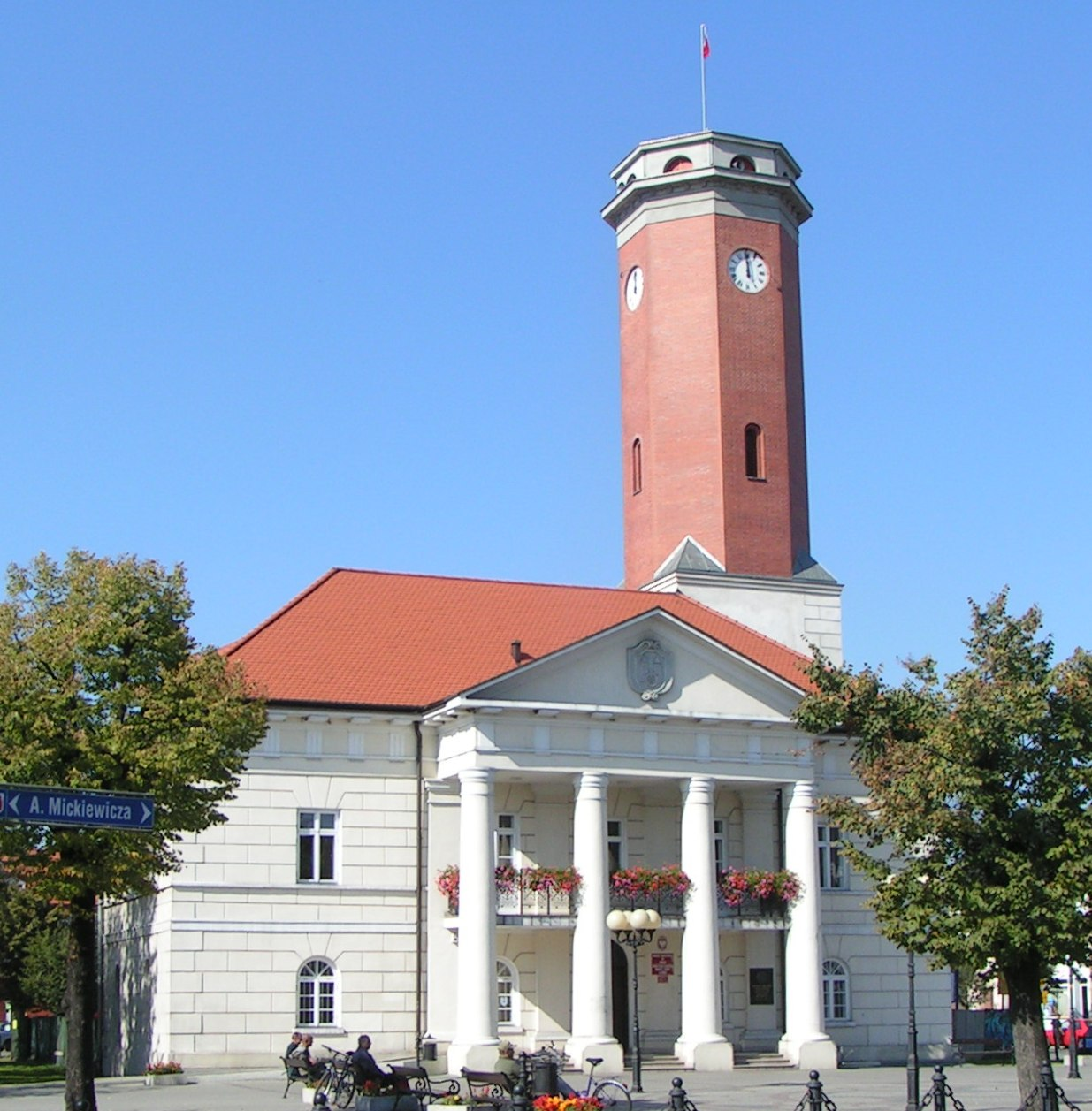
Town hall

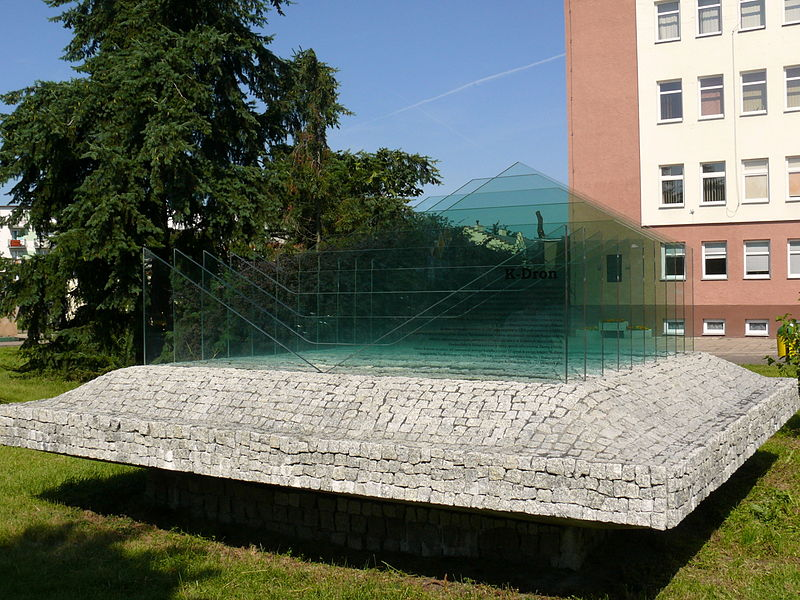
A monument to the K-dron

- Olimpia Koło – football team (3rd league 1960, 1963–1965)
- Maratończyk Koło – korfball team. Champion of Poland.

== Transport ==
National road 92 bypasses Koło to the east.

Vovoideship roads 473 and 270 meet in the town.

Koło has a station on the Berlin-Warsaw railway line.

== Notable residents ==
- Franciszek Ksawery Dmochowski – novelist, poet, translator, publisher, critic, and satirist
- Tomasz Kos – football player (FC Erzgebirge Aue)
- Jan Pusty – retired hurdler
- Aron Brand – pediatric cardiologist
- George Chapman – Anglo-Polish serial killer
- Meir Auerbach – chief Ashkenazi rabbi of Jerusalem

== International relations ==
=== Twin towns – Sister cities ===
Koło is twinned with:

- (Germany) Reinbek
- (Ukraine) Ladyzhyn
