= Jadwiga Orska =

Polish geologist and petrographer

Jadwiga Joanna Orska
- Born: 8 March 1923
- Died: 28 January 2004 (aged 80); Warsaw
- Education: University of Warsaw, AGH University of Science and Technology
- Occupations: geologist, petrographer

Jadwiga Joanna Orska (8 March 1923 – 28 January 2004) was a Polish geologist, petrographer, and specialist in the geology of chemical raw materials deposits, particularly salts. She was the co-discoverer of a deposit of polyhalite salts in the area of the Bay of Puck in the southern Baltic Sea, off the shores of Gdańsk Pomerania, Poland.

== Education ==
Jadwiga Orska earned her secondary school certificate in 1946 at the Jan Kochanowski Secondary School in Warsaw. From 1948, she worked at the Polish State Geological Institute. She completed three years of geological studies at the Faculty of Geology of the University of Warsaw, followed by two years at the Faculty of Geology and Exploration of the AGH University of Science and Technology in Kraków. In 1962, she earned a master's degree in geology.

== Career ==
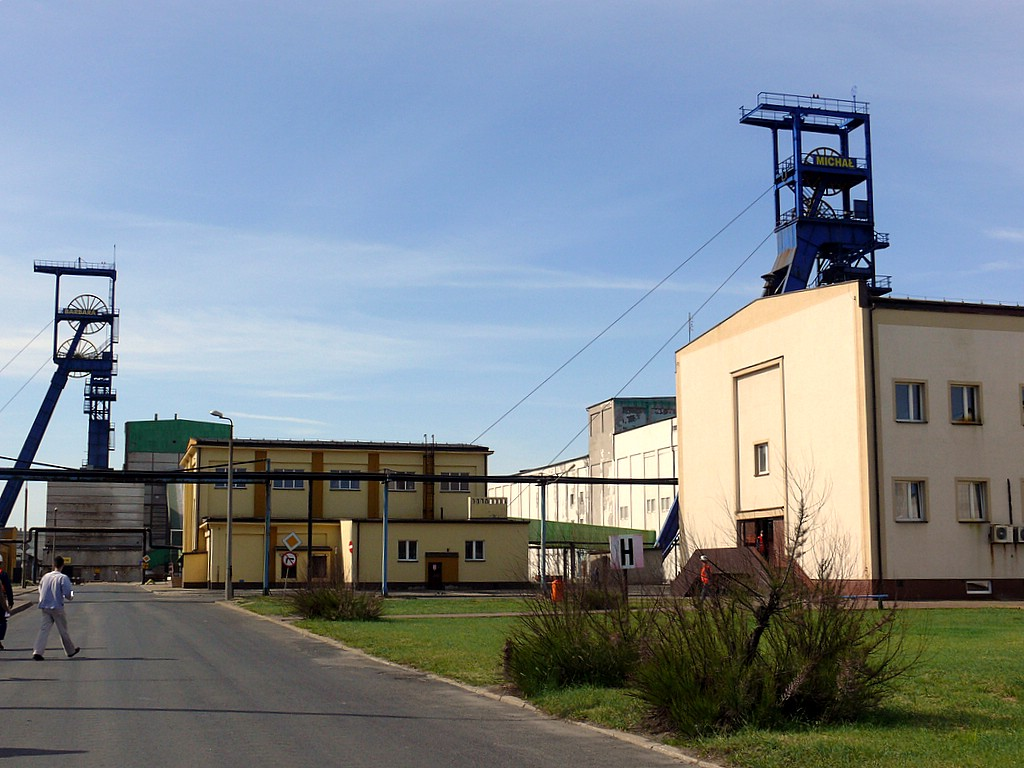
Kłodawa salt mine

Between 1955 and 1958, Orska worked on mapping the underground workings of the Kłodawa salt mine, working out the petrographic composition of the documented salts.

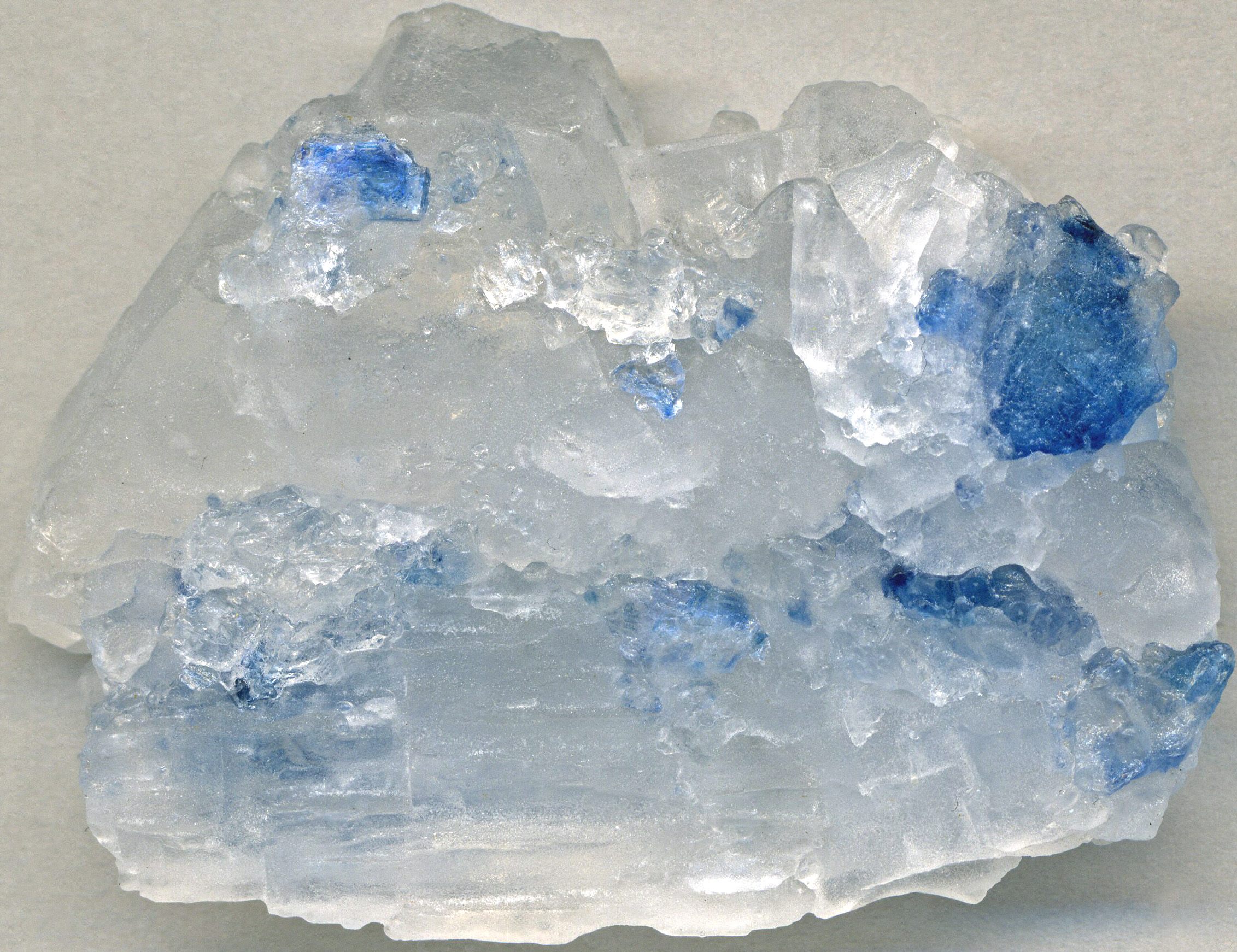
Rock salt (halitite) (Klodawa Salt Dome, Zechstein Formation, Upper Permian; Klodawa Salt Mine, central Poland)

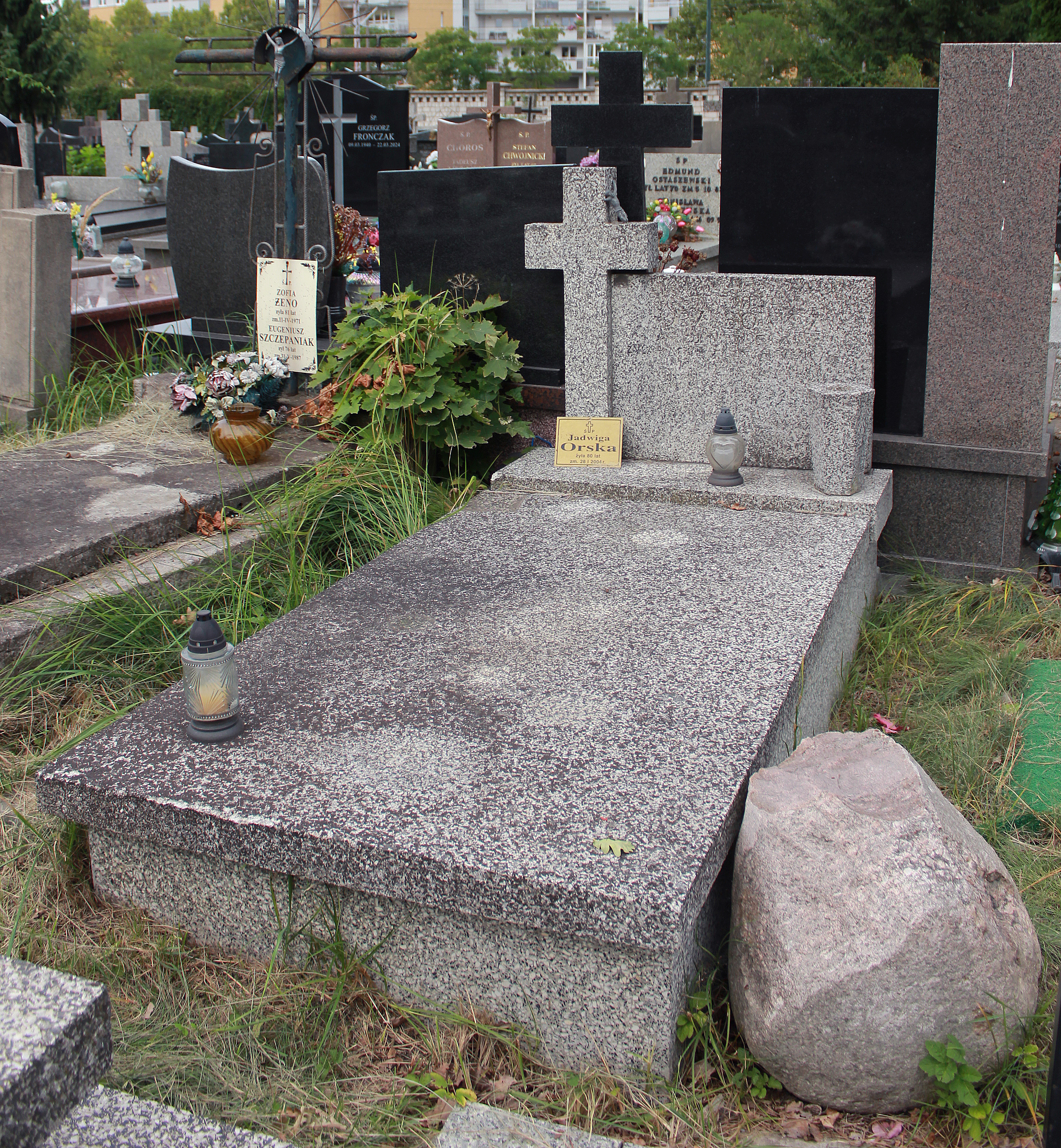
The grave of Jadwiga Orska with a granite bolder beside it, 2025 - fot. Ivonna Nowicka

From 1961 she headed the Salt Petrography Laboratory of the Department of Salt Deposits and Chemical Raw Materials of the Polish Geological Institute (Polish: Pracownia Petrografii Soli Zakładu Złóż Soli i Surowców Chemicznych Państwowego Instytutu Geologicznego). She conducted mineralogical, petrographic and physicochemical studies of salt rocks of the Góra, Lubień, Damasławek, Kłodawa and Łętkowice-Siedlec salt deposits. She also studied Zechstein halite Permian rock layers from deep boreholes in the Polish Lowlands.

Following the discovery of Zechstein polyhalite salts in the Puck Bay area in 1964, Orska was involved in their identification and documentation. For the discovery and documentation of these salts, she earned a collective State Award, Second Class (Polish: Nagroda Państwowa II Stopnia), in technology in 1968.

During 1969, she studied Alpine rock salt deposits at the University of Vienna, Austria and the University of Basel, Switzerland through a six-month United Nations scholarship. In 1970, she was awarded the Golden Cross of Merit by the Polish state.

In early 1976, Orska took over the management of the Department of Salt and Chemical Raw Materials of the State Geological Institute. At that time, the department carried out prospecting, identification and documentation of Zechstein and Miocene deposits of rock salt and potassium-magnesium, phosphorites and other chemical raw materials. In 1980, she received an award for Geological Documentation of a category C rock salt deposit in the Lubień salt diapir.

Orska was the author and co-author of numerous publications and more than 30 archival studies.

== Later life ==
Jadwiga Orska died in Warsaw on 28 January 2004.
