= Kazimierz Waliszewski =

Polish historian (1849–1935)

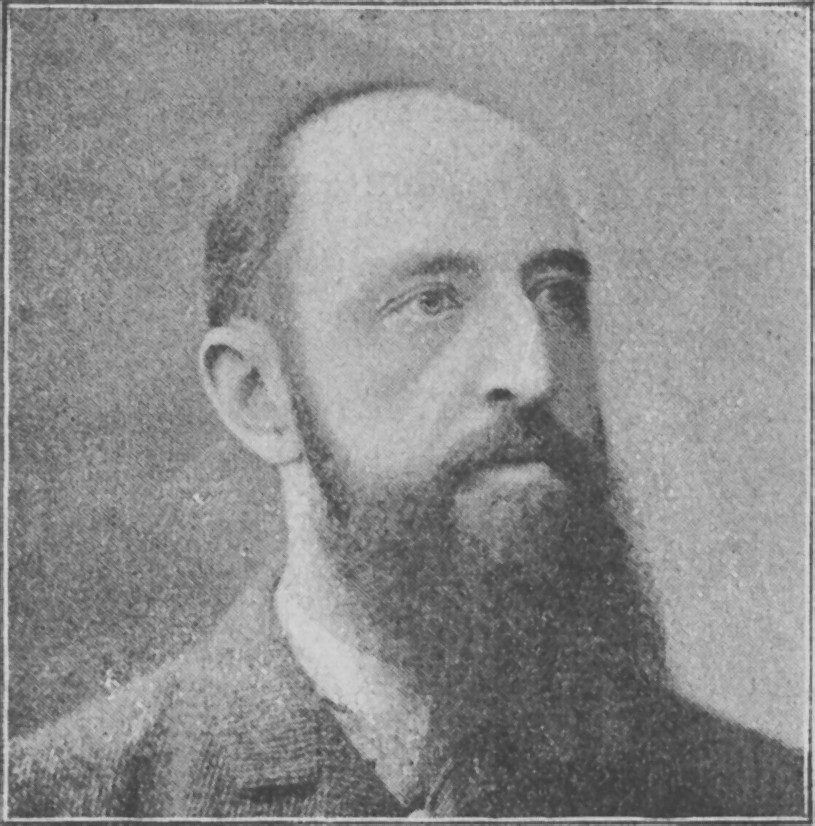
- Born: 1849; Gole, Congress Poland
- Died: 1935 (aged 85–86); Paris, France
- Occupations: Historian, writer

Kazimierz Klemens Waliszewski (1849–1935) was a Polish author of history who wrote primarily about Russian history. He studied in Warsaw and Paris.

== Background ==
Waliszewski was born in Gole, in Congress Poland. He wrote detailed, scholarly works covering nearly three centuries of Russian history from Ivan the Terrible to the end of the nineteenth century. He began research in 1870, and devoted over thirty years of work in libraries and archives in Paris, London, Berlin, Vienna, and Saint Petersburg. Several of his works written in French were translated into other languages. Waliszewski also researched Polish history and his book Poland, the Unknown offers a defence of the country's history against hostile Russian and German interpretations.

As a man of letters, Waliszewski expressed his intention to introduce Joseph Conrad to the Polish public in 1903, after the two had exchanged a number of letters.

== Selected books ==
- Marysieńka, Marie de la Grange D'Arquien: Queen of Poland, and Wife of Sobieski. 1641-1716. London: W. Heinemann. 1898.
- A History of Russian Literature. D. Appleton. 1915.
- Peter the Great. London: W. Heinemann. 1898. ISBN 978-0-8383-0265-1.
- The Romance of an Empress, Catherine II of Russia. New York: D. Appleton. 1900.
- Ivan the Terrible. Stroud: Nonsuch. 2006 [1904]. ISBN 9781845880804. The original edition at archive.org.
- A History of Russian Literature. D. Appleton. 1915.
- Waliszewski, Kazimierz (2017) [1919]. Poland, the Unknown. Trieste Publishing. ISBN 9780649156894.
- The Story of a Throne (Catharine II of Russia). London: W. Heinemann. 1895.
- Paul the First of Russia, the son of Catherine the Great. London: W. Heinemann. 1913.
