= Rutkowice =

Rutkowice may refer to the following places:

- Rutkowice, Kuyavian-Pomeranian Voivodeship (central Poland)
- Rutkowice, Warmian-Masurian Voivodeship (north-central Poland)
