= Gocław =

Gocław may refer to the following places in Poland:

- Gocław, Warsaw
- Gocław, Szczecin
- Gocław, Kuyavian-Pomeranian Voivodeship
- Gocław, Masovian Voivodeship
