= Nowe Czaple =

Nowe Czaple may refer to the following places:

- Nowe Czaple, Kuyavian-Pomeranian Voivodeship (north-central Poland)
- Nowe Czaple, Lubusz Voivodeship (west Poland)
- Nowe Czaple, Pomeranian Voivodeship (north Poland)
