= Kłóbka-Nowy Młyn =

- Village
- Location within Poland
- Coordinates: 52°26′27″N 19°07′29″E
- Country: Poland
- Voivodeship: Kuyavian-Pomeranian
- County: Włocławek
- Gmina: Lubień Kujawski

Kłóbka-Nowy Młyn [ˈkwupka ˈnɔvɨ ˈmwɨn] is a village in the administrative district of Gmina Lubień Kujawski, within Włocławek County, Kuyavian-Pomeranian Voivodeship, in north-central Poland.
