= Andrzej Ruciński =

Polish politician

member of Sejm 2005-2007
- In office 25 September 2005 – 2007

Personal details
- Born: 25 October 1958 (age 67) Kłodawa
- Party: Samoobrona

Andrzej Ruciński (born 25 October 1958) is a Polish politician. He was elected to the Sejm on 25 September 2005, getting 2366 votes in 37 Konin district as a candidate from Samoobrona Rzeczpospolitej Polskiej list.

== See also ==
- Members of Polish Sejm 2005-2007
