= Kłodawa Salt Mine =

Salt mine in Poland

Coordinates: 52.238°N 18.922°E

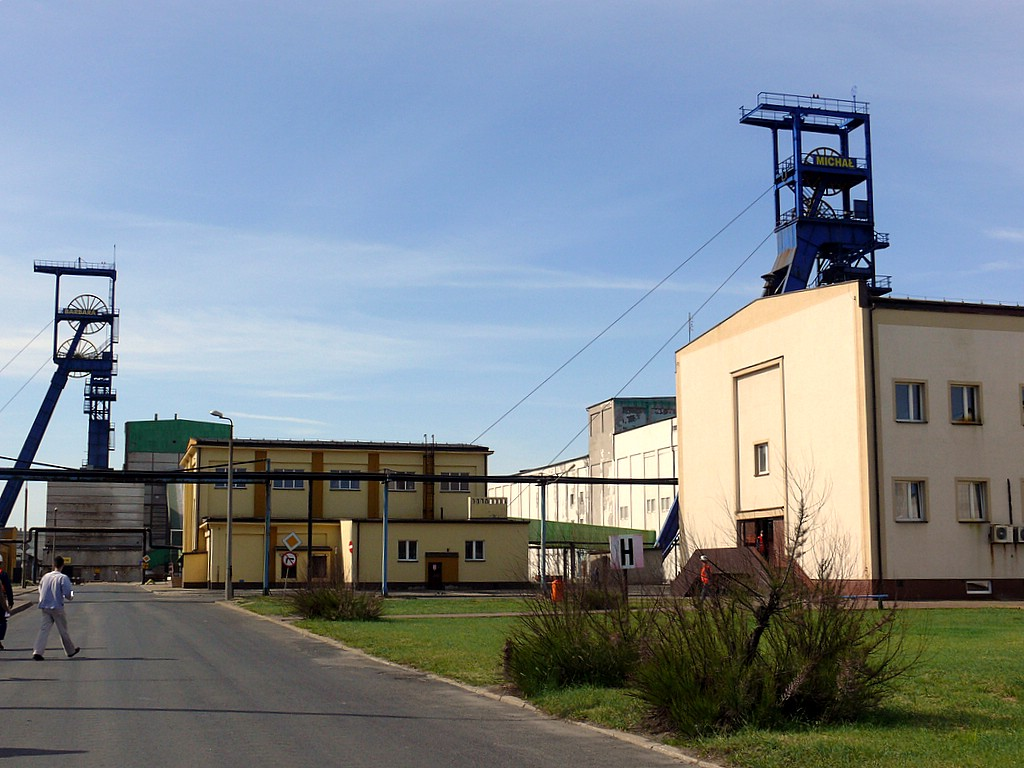
Kłodawa Salt Mine

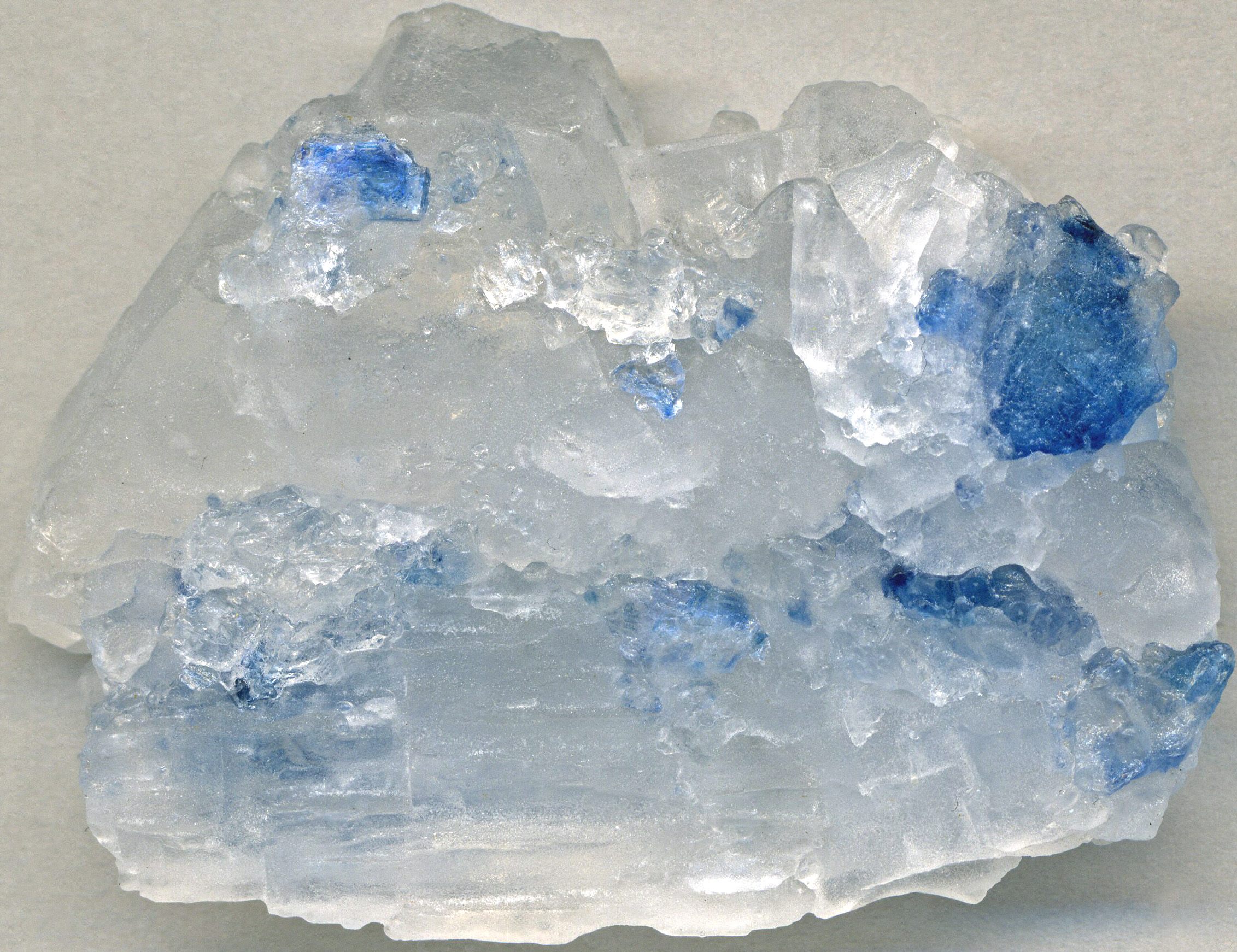
Rock salt specimen from Klodawa Salt Mine. The blue color is due to irradiation or tectonic stretching.

The Kłodawa Salt Mine (Polish: Kopalnia Soli Kłodawa, KSK) is the biggest operating salt mine in Poland. It is located in Kłodawa, Koło County, Greater Poland Voivodship.

== History ==
In 1939 Polish professor Edward Walery Janczewski discovered geological layer of salt between Izbica Kujawska and Solca Wielka. It was 63 kilometres long and 4 kilometres wide. First drillings were done during German occupation of Poland and it was realized that Kłodawa is the best place to build a salt mine; it was also said that Izbica Kujawska had a good salt supply, but much smaller than Kłodawa.

The first two mineshafts (called Michał and Barbara, – named after the first director of the mine and Saint Barbara), were built from 1950 to 1954. Between 1955-1958, geologist Jadwiga Orska worked on mapping the petrographic composition of the documented salts. The salt has been drilled since 1956. Until 1966 horses were the main way to drill the salt, in this year the electronic traction drive was built. The third mineshaft, located about 4 kilometres from Michał and Barbara, is named Chrobry (after first Polish king, Bolesław I Chrobry).

There is an underground touristic route in the mine, opened for visitors. It is scheduled to open the first underground sanatorium in Poland in Kłodawa Salt Mine.

On September 7, 2012 the salt mine suffered from a fire.

== Salt ==
There are different types of salt drilling in Kłodawa Salt Mine. All of them come from Zechstein. The salt in Kłodawa is the only salt in Poland which is colourful (pink and blue) and colourful elements in Wieliczka Salt Mine come from Kłodawa Salt Mine.

== See also ==
- Wieliczka Salt Mine
- Bochnia Salt Mine
- Kłodawa
- Khewra Salt Mine, in Punjab, Pakistan
