= Wola Olszowa-Parcele =

- Village
- Location within Poland
- Coordinates: 52°22′N 19°15′E
- Country: Poland
- Voivodeship: Kuyavian-Pomeranian
- County: Włocławek
- Gmina: Lubień Kujawski
- Number Zone: (+48) 54
- Vehicle registration: CWL

Wola Olszowa-Parcele [ˈvɔla ɔlˈʂɔva parˈt͡sɛlɛ] is a village in the administrative district of Gmina Lubień Kujawski, within Włocławek County, Kuyavian-Pomeranian Voivodeship, in north-central Poland.
