= Kłóbka =

- Village
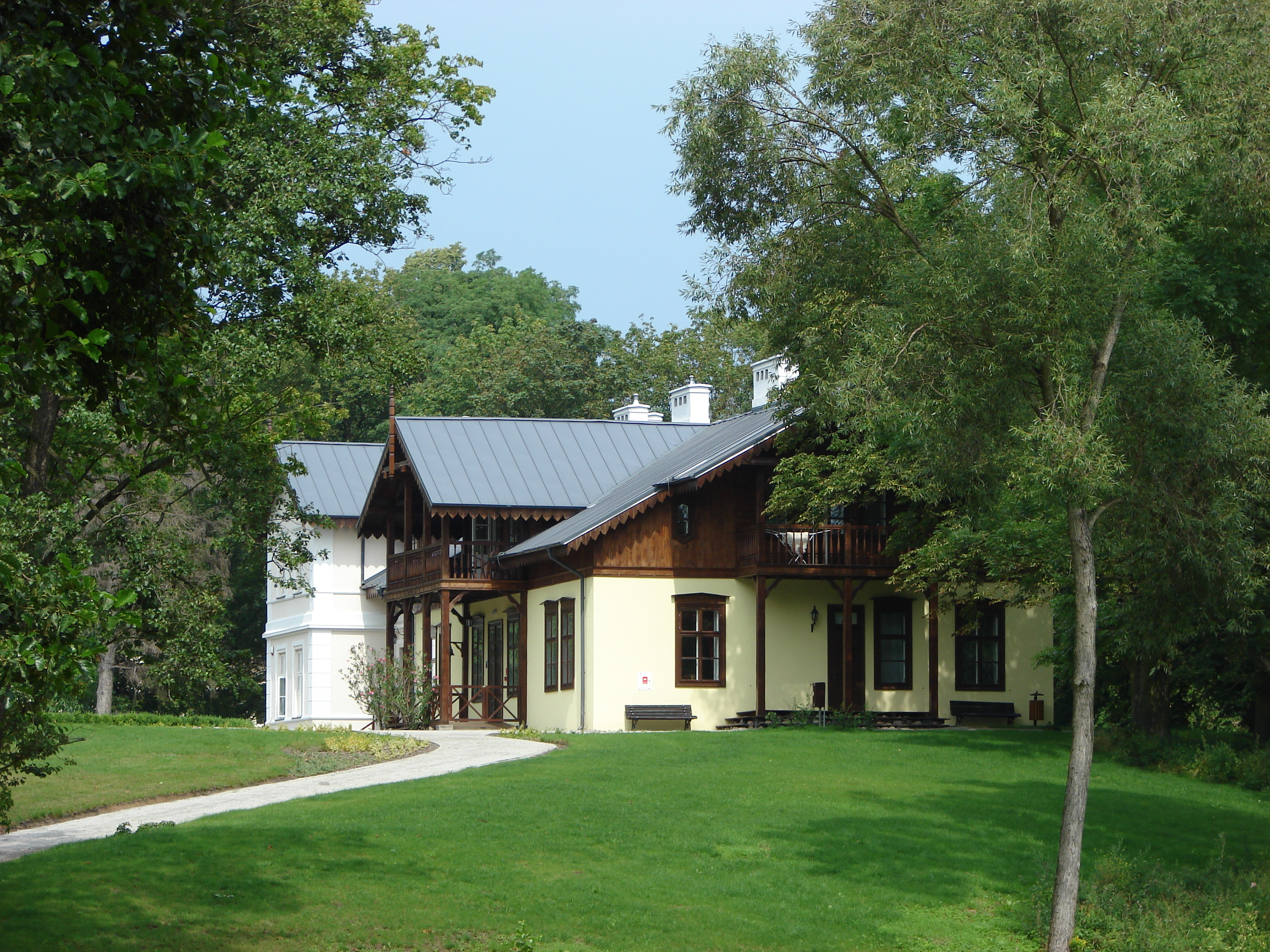
- The manor house, 19th century.

- Location within Poland
- Coordinates: 52°27′N 19°8′E
- Country: Poland
- Voivodeship: Kuyavian-Pomeranian
- County: Włocławek
- Gmina: Lubień Kujawski

Kłóbka [ˈkwupka] is a village in the administrative district of Gmina Lubień Kujawski, within Włocławek County, Kuyavian-Pomeranian Voivodeship, in north-central Poland.

Maria Wodzińska, the artist known especially for having been the fiancée of Frédéric Chopin, spent the later part of her life in Kłóbka.
