= Fryderyk Skarbek =

Polish noble (1792–1866)

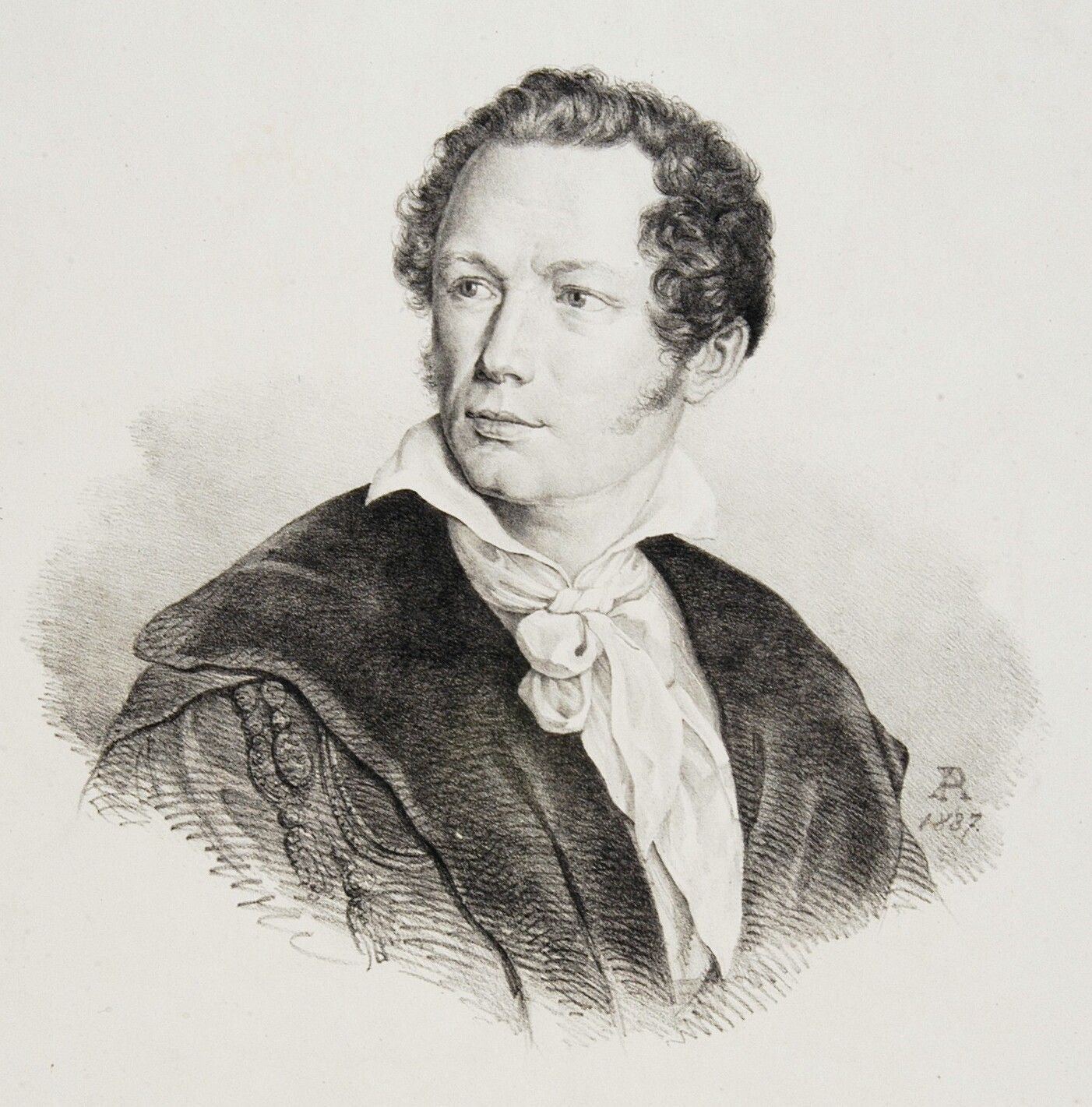
Fryderyk Skarbek, by Adolf Piwarski, 1837

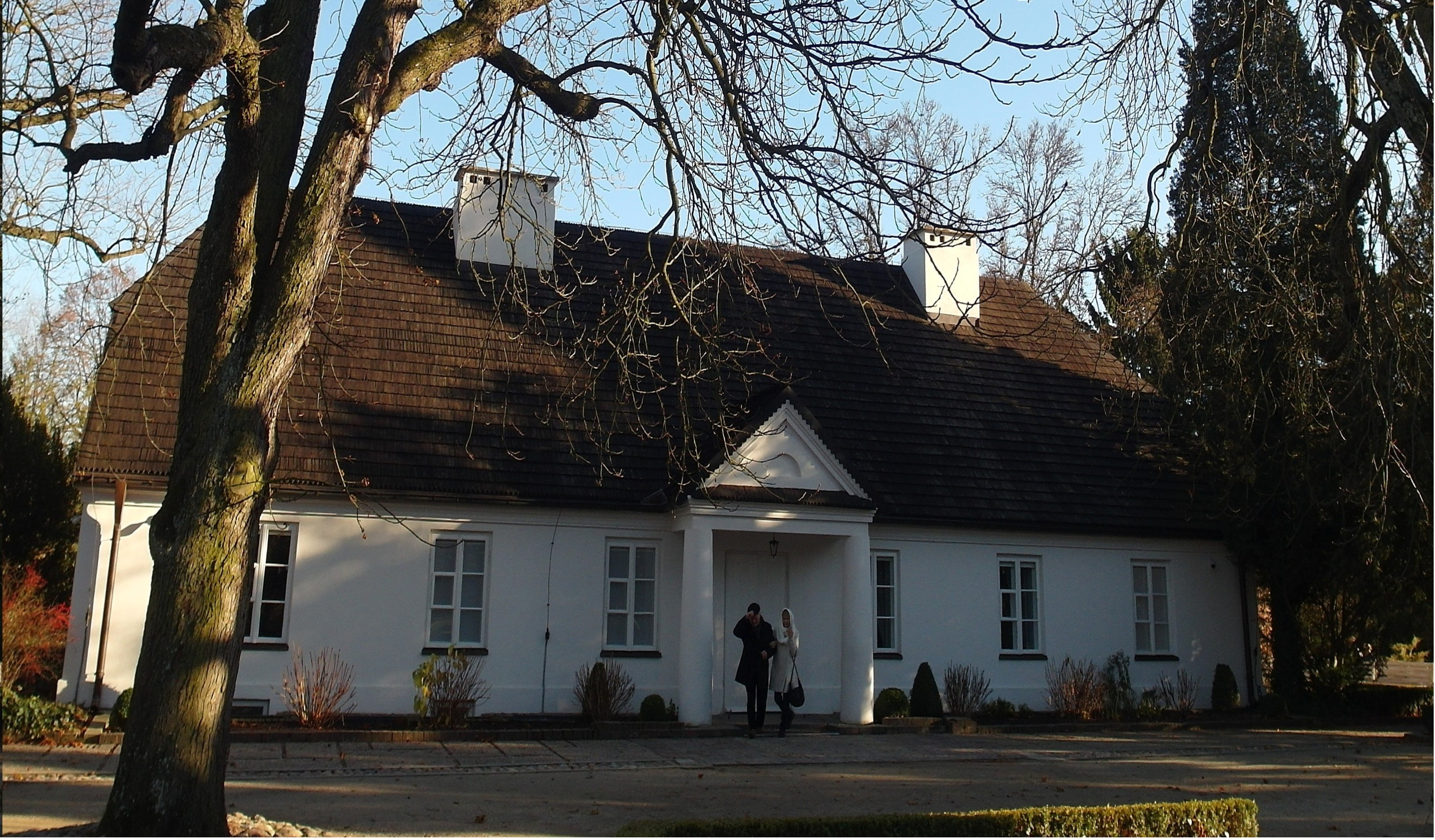
Fryderyk Chopin's birthplace: outbuilding of nonexistent Skarbek Palace at Żelazowa Wola

Fryderyk Florian Skarbek (15 February 1792 – 25 September 1866), a member of the Polish nobility, was an economist, novelist, historian, social activist, administrator, politician, and penologist who designed the Pawiak Prison of World War II ill fame.

He is also known for his friendship with his godson Frédéric Chopin and Chopin's family. His son Józef would marry Chopin's erstwhile fiancée, Maria Wodzińska.

== Life ==
Fryderyk (in English, "Frederick") Skarbek lived during a complex historic period: beginning in independent Poland, continuing from 1793 in Prussian Poland, (Note: Toruń became Prussian in 1793 (in the Second Partition of Poland), Warsaw in 1795 (in the Third Partition of Poland).) later in the Duchy of Warsaw (1807–13) created by Napoleon, then from 1815 in the Kingdom of Poland, whose king was the Tsar of Russia.

=== Childhood and education (1792-1818) ===
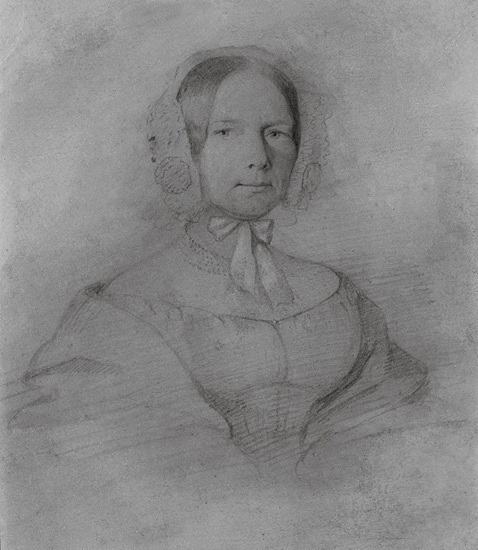
Anna Emilia Wiesiołowska, née Skarbek (1793-1873), sister of Fryderyk Skarbek and godmother of Fryderyk Chopin, by Maria Wodzińska

Fryderyk Skarbek was born in Toruń, son of Kacper Skarbek, whose aristocratic family had roots dating back to medieval times, and of Ludwika Fenger, daughter of a rich Toruń merchant of German descent. He was the first of four children. Around 1800 the family, which had lived at Izbica Kujawska, moved to Żelazowa Wola. In 1802 Nicolas Chopin (the composer's father) was hired as the children's teacher.

In 1808 Fryderyk graduated from the Warsaw Lyceum (a secondary school in Warsaw). In 1809 he left for Paris, where he studied economics. He became, while absent in Paris, vicariously godfather to the composer Frédéric Chopin (1810–49), who had been born on the Skarbek estate in Żelazowa Wola. (Note: Chopin's baptismal register of 23 April 1810 gives a Franciszek Grembecki as his godfather, but Chopin had earlier had an emergency baptism after his birth (around 1 March), and in some letters (e.g., in 1846) Chopin writes about Skarbek having been his godfather.) In 1812 he returned to Poland and worked as a translator in the Duchy's administration; then he devoted some years to local administration of the Sochaczew district.

Skarbek married twice:

- in 1818, Prakseda Gzowska (died 1836): they had one child, Józef, who would marry Chopin's fiancée, Maria Wodzińska;
- in 1838, Pelagia Rutkowska: they had a daughter and two sons, who were several times imprisoned for Polish patriotic activities.

=== Professor and sociologist ===
In 1818 he became professor of economics at the University of Warsaw. He received a doctorate from the University of Kraków in 1819.

In 1820-30 he published several books on economics, in Polish (1821, 1824) and in French (1829).

Under the influence of Stanislaw Staszic, he became interested in questions concerning the poor, charity houses, and prisons; he worked for the department of prisons and charitable establishments of the Ministry of Internal Affairs. When in 1828 he went to Paris to publish a book, the government commissioned him to report on prisons in Holland and Great Britain. Upon returning to Warsaw, he designed the Pawiak prison (completed 1835).

He was a pioneer in economic theory, and his 1829 work, Théorie des richesses sociales (Theory of Social Wealth), influenced Karl Marx's theory of labor. He also authored dramas and novels.

=== 1830-31 crisis ===
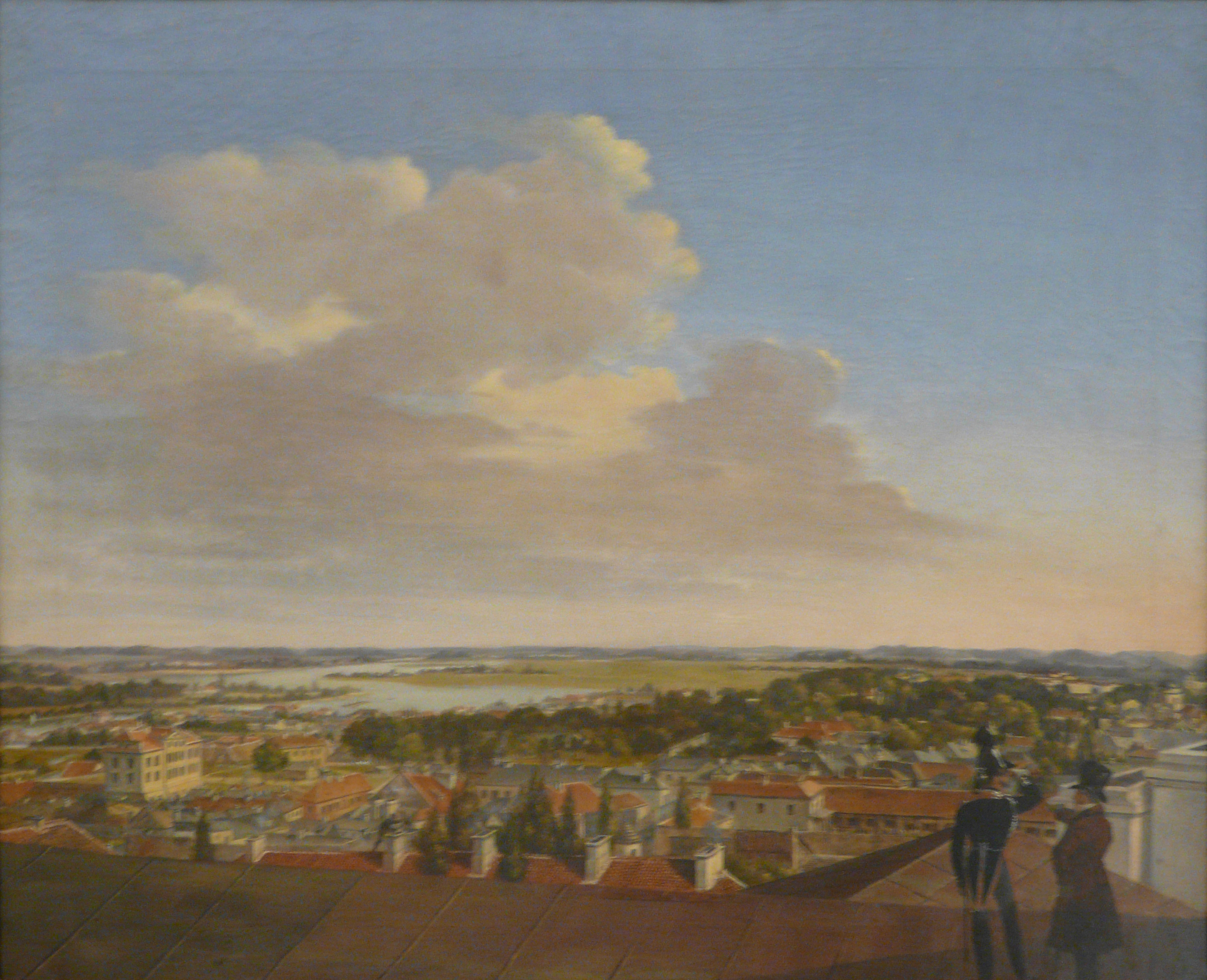
View of Warsaw from the Warsaw Society of Friends of Learning building, ca. 1825, by Fryderyk Skarbek

Politically, Skarbek favored accommodation with the Russian authorities. In November 1830, at the outbreak of the Polish November 1830 Uprising against Russia, he was in Saint Petersburg, Russia, having been summoned by Tsar Nicholas I to inspect Russian prisons.

He remained in Russia for the duration of the Uprising. In March 1831 he became a member of the Provisional Council of the Kingdom, (Note: Cf. NIFC 2007. The "Provisional Council" was probably a creation of the Russian Tsar's, to stand as a rival to the "National Government" that had been created in January 1831 by the Polish Sejm.) and he returned to Poland only after Warsaw had been captured in September 1831 by Russian General Ivan Paskevich.

=== Late career (1832-58) ===
Despite Russian Poland's deteriorating situation under Paskevich as Namestnik of the Kingdom of Poland (1831–55) — with the changing of the Constitution in 1832, the closing of Warsaw University in 1833, the promotion of Russification — Skarbek went on to serve in the administration, as president of the Central Council of Welfare Charity Works, and later as president of the Directorate of Insurance.

Tsar Nicholas I awarded him the Order of Saint Stanislaus, Second Class; and in 1846 gave him the Russian hereditary title of Count, after Skarbek had failed to obtain confirmation of a previous hereditary title of count.

In 1854 Skarbek became director of the Justice Committee (Minister of Justice).

He retired in 1858 and returned to scholarly and literary work, including his Memoirs which were published in 1876. He died in Warsaw in 1866, of sepsis.

== Selected works ==
=== Scholarly ===
- The National Economy, 1829
- Théorie des richesses sociales (Theory of Social Wealth), 1829
- General Principles of the Science of the National Economy, 1859
- The Farm and the National Economy, 1860
- The History of the Duchy of Warsaw, 1860

=== Literary ===
- Pan Antoni (Anthony), 1824
- Pan Starosta (Starosta), 1826
- Życie i przypadki Faustyna Feliksa na Dodoszach Dodosińskiego (The Life and Adventures of Faustyn Feliks Dodosiński of Dodosze), 1838
- Pamiętniki Seglasa (The Memoirs of Seglas), 1845

== Bibliography ==
- Jerzy Sewer Dunin-Borkowski, Almanach błękitny (The Blue Almanac), Lwów, 1909, p. 547 et passim.
- Piotr Mysłakowski, Andrzej Sikorski, Fryderyk Chopin: The Origins, Narodowy Instytut Fryderyka Chopina (Fryderyk Chopin Institute), Warsaw, 2010, pp. 216–30.
- Piotr Mysłakowski, Andrzej Sikorski, Fryderyk Skarbek (in Polish), Narodowy Instytut Fryderyka Chopina (Fryderyk Chopin Institute), 2007.
- Teodor Żychliński, Złota księga szlachty polskiej (Gold Book of the Polish Nobility), rocznik XXV (volume XXV), Poznań, 1903, pp. 110–15.
