= Henryków, Kuyavian-Pomeranian Voivodeship =

Henryków
- Village
- Location within Poland
- Coordinates: 52°22′47″N 19°10′32″E
- Country: Poland
- Voivodeship: Kuyavian-Pomeranian
- County: Włocławek
- Gmina: Lubień Kujawski

Henryków [xɛnˈrɨkuf] is a village in the administrative district of Gmina Lubień Kujawski, within Włocławek County, Kuyavian-Pomeranian Voivodeship, in north-central Poland.
