= Bileńska Kolonia =

- Village
- Location within Poland
- Coordinates: 52°26′15″N 19°12′04″E
- Country: Poland
- Voivodeship: Kuyavian-Pomeranian
- County: Włocławek
- Gmina: Lubień Kujawski
- Time zone: UTC+1 (CET)
  - Summer (DST): UTC+2 (CEST)
- Number Zone: (+48) 54
- Vehicle registration: CWL

Bileńska Kolonia [biˈlɛɲska kɔˈlɔɲa] is a village in the administrative district of Gmina Lubień Kujawski, within Włocławek County, Kuyavian-Pomeranian Voivodeship, in central Poland.
