= Kąty, Gmina Lubień Kujawski =

Kąty
- Village
- Location within Poland
- Coordinates: 52°21′59″N 19°13′13″E
- Country: Poland
- Voivodeship: Kuyavian-Pomeranian
- County: Włocławek
- Gmina: Lubień Kujawski

Kąty [ˈkɔntɨ] is a village in the administrative district of Gmina Lubień Kujawski, within Włocławek County, Kuyavian-Pomeranian Voivodeship, in north-central Poland.
