= Stępka, Kuyavian-Pomeranian Voivodeship =

Stępka
- Village
- Location within Poland
- Coordinates: 52°24′31″N 19°10′23″E
- Country: Poland
- Voivodeship: Kuyavian-Pomeranian
- County: Włocławek
- Gmina: Lubień Kujawski

Stępka [ˈstɛmpka] is a village in the administrative district of Gmina Lubień Kujawski, within Włocławek County, Kuyavian-Pomeranian Voivodeship, in north-central Poland.
