= Gmina Lubień Kujawski =

Gmina Lubień Kujawski Lubień Kujawski Commune
- Gmina
- Flag Coat of arms
- Interactive map of Gmina Lubień Kujawski
- Coordinates (Lubień Kujawski): 52°24′17″N 19°9′53″E
- Country: Poland
- Voivodeship: Kuyavian-Pomeranian
- County: Włocławek County
- Seat: Lubień Kujawski

Area
  - Total: 150.21 km^{2} (58.00 sq mi)

Population (2006)
  - Total: 7,514
  - Density: 50.02/km^{2} (129.6/sq mi)
  - Urban: 1,299
  - Rural: 6,215
- Time zone: UTC+1 (CET)
  - Summer (DST): UTC+2 (CEST)
- Vehicle registration: CWL
- Website: http://www.lubien.kujawy.pl/strona/

Gmina Lubień Kujawski is an urban-rural gmina (administrative district) in Włocławek County, Kuyavian-Pomeranian Voivodeship, in central Poland. Its seat is the town of Lubień Kujawski, which lies approximately 29 kilometres (18 mi) south of Włocławek and 79 km (49 mi) south-east of Toruń.

The gmina covers an area of 150.21 square kilometres (58.0 sq mi), and as of 2006 its total population is 7,514 (out of which the population of Lubień Kujawski amounts to 1,299, and the population of the rural part of the gmina is 6,215).

== Villages ==
Apart from the town of Lubień Kujawski, Gmina Lubień Kujawski contains the villages and settlements of Antoniewo, Bagno, Beszyn, Bileńska Kolonia, Bilno, Błędowo, Błonie, Chojny, Chwalibogowo, Czaple, Dziankówek, Dziankowo, Gliznowo, Gocław, Gole, Golska Huta, Henryków, Kaczawka, Kaliska, Kamienna, Kanibród, Kąty, Kłóbka, Kłóbka-Nowy Młyn, Kłóbka-Podgórze, Kobyla Łąka, Kołomia, Kostulin, Kretkowo, Krzewie, Krzewie Drugie, Modlibórz, Morzyce, Narty, Narty-Piaski, Nowa Wieś, Nowe Czaple, Nowe Gagowy, Rutkowice, Rzegocin, Rzeżewo, Siemiany, Sławęcin, Sławęckie Góry, Stare Gagowy, Stępka, Stróże, Świerna, Szewo, Uchodze, Walentowo, Wąwał, Wiktorowo, Wola Dziankowska, Wola Olszowa, Wola Olszowa-Parcele and Zakrzewo.

== Neighbouring gminas ==
Gmina Lubień Kujawski is bordered by the gminas of Baruchowo, Choceń, Chodecz, Gostynin, Kowal, Łanięta and Nowe Ostrowy.
