= Czaple, Włocławek County =

Czaple
- Village
- Location within Poland
- Coordinates: 52°24′N 19°13′E
- Country: Poland
- Voivodeship: Kuyavian-Pomeranian
- County: Włocławek
- Gmina: Lubień Kujawski

Czaple [ˈt͡ʂaplɛ] is a village in the administrative district of Gmina Lubień Kujawski, within Włocławek County, Kuyavian-Pomeranian Voivodeship, in north-central Poland.
