= Gliznowo =

- Village
- Location within Poland
- Coordinates: 52°21′N 19°7′E
- Country: Poland
- Voivodeship: Kuyavian-Pomeranian
- County: Włocławek
- Gmina: Lubień Kujawski

Gliznowo [ɡlizˈnɔvɔ] is a village in the administrative district of Gmina Lubień Kujawski, within Włocławek County, Kuyavian-Pomeranian Voivodeship, in north-central Poland.
