= Stróże, Kuyavian-Pomeranian Voivodeship =

Stróże
- Village
- Location within Poland
- Coordinates: 52°23′28″N 19°6′56″E
- Country: Poland
- Voivodeship: Kuyavian-Pomeranian
- County: Włocławek
- Gmina: Lubień Kujawski
- Population: 60

Stróże [ˈstruʐɛ] is a village in the administrative district of Gmina Lubień Kujawski, within Włocławek County, Kuyavian-Pomeranian Voivodeship, in north-central Poland.
