= Kobyla Łąka, Kuyavian-Pomeranian Voivodeship =

Kobyla Łąka
- Village
- Location within Poland
- Coordinates: 52°23′11″N 19°08′02″E
- Country: Poland
- Voivodeship: Kuyavian-Pomeranian
- County: Włocławek
- Gmina: Lubień Kujawski

Kobyla Łąka [kɔˈbɨla ˈwɔnka] is a village in the administrative district of Gmina Lubień Kujawski, within Włocławek County, Kuyavian-Pomeranian Voivodeship, in north-central Poland.
