= Kamienna, Kuyavian-Pomeranian Voivodeship =

Kamienna
- Village
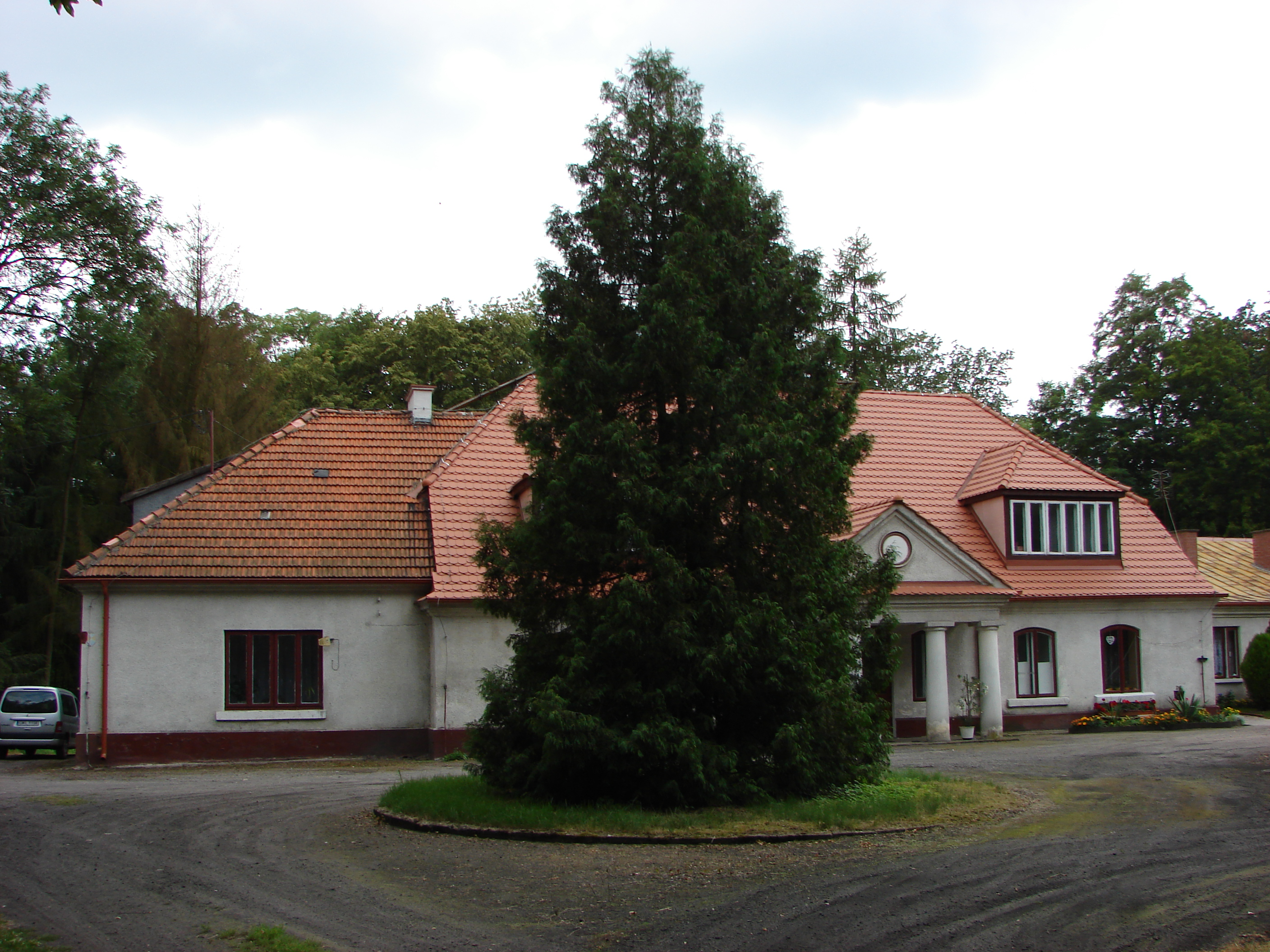
- The manor house. Was built in the first half of the 19th century.

- Location within Poland
- Coordinates: 52°22′N 19°9′E
- Country: Poland
- Voivodeship: Kuyavian-Pomeranian
- County: Włocławek
- Gmina: Lubień Kujawski

Kamienna [kaˈmjɛnna] is a village in the administrative district of Gmina Lubień Kujawski, within Włocławek County, Kuyavian-Pomeranian Voivodeship, in north-central Poland.
