= Nowe Gagowy =

- Village
- Location within Poland
- Coordinates: 52°26′0″N 19°11′45″E
- Country: Poland
- Voivodeship: Kuyavian-Pomeranian
- County: Włocławek
- Gmina: Lubień Kujawski

Nowe Gagowy [ˈnɔvɛ ɡaˈɡɔvɨ] is a village in the administrative district of Gmina Lubień Kujawski, within Włocławek County, Kuyavian-Pomeranian Voivodeship, in north-central Poland.
