= Uchodze =

- Village
- Location within Poland
- Coordinates: 52°23′36″N 19°08′33″E
- Country: Poland
- Voivodeship: Kuyavian-Pomeranian
- County: Włocławek
- Gmina: Lubień Kujawski

Uchodze [uˈxɔd͡zɛ] is a village in the administrative district of Gmina Lubień Kujawski, within Włocławek County, Kuyavian-Pomeranian Voivodeship, in north-central Poland.
