= Stare Gagowy =

- Village
- Location within Poland
- Coordinates: 52°25′32″N 19°9′54″E
- Country: Poland
- Voivodeship: Kuyavian-Pomeranian
- County: Włocławek
- Gmina: Lubień Kujawski
- Population: 260

Stare Gagowy [ˈstarɛ ɡaˈɡɔvɨ] is a village in the administrative district of Gmina Lubień Kujawski, within Włocławek County, Kuyavian-Pomeranian Voivodeship, in north-central Poland.
