= Wola Dziankowska =

- Village
- Location within Poland
- Coordinates: 52°24′42″N 19°16′49″E
- Country: Poland
- Voivodeship: Kuyavian-Pomeranian
- County: Włocławek
- Gmina: Lubień Kujawski

Wola Dziankowska [ˈvɔla d͡ʑaŋˈkɔfska] is a village in the administrative district of Gmina Lubień Kujawski, within Włocławek County, Kuyavian-Pomeranian Voivodeship, in north-central Poland.
