= Rzegocin, Kuyavian-Pomeranian Voivodeship =

Rzegocin
- Village
- Location within Poland
- Coordinates: 52°28′24″N 19°07′44″E
- Country: Poland
- Voivodeship: Kuyavian-Pomeranian
- County: Włocławek
- Gmina: Lubień Kujawski

Rzegocin [ʐɛˈɡɔt͡ɕin] is a village in the administrative district of Gmina Lubień Kujawski, within Włocławek County, Kuyavian-Pomeranian Voivodeship, in north-central Poland.
