= Narty-Piaski =

- Village
- Location within Poland
- Coordinates: 52°22′19″N 19°11′29″E
- Country: Poland
- Voivodeship: Kuyavian-Pomeranian
- County: Włocławek
- Gmina: Lubień Kujawski

Narty-Piaski (Polish pronunciation: [ˈnartɨ ˈpjaskʲi]) is a village in the administrative district of Gmina Lubień Kujawski, within Włocławek County, Kuyavian-Pomeranian Voivodeship, in north-central Poland.
