= Rzeżewo =

- Village
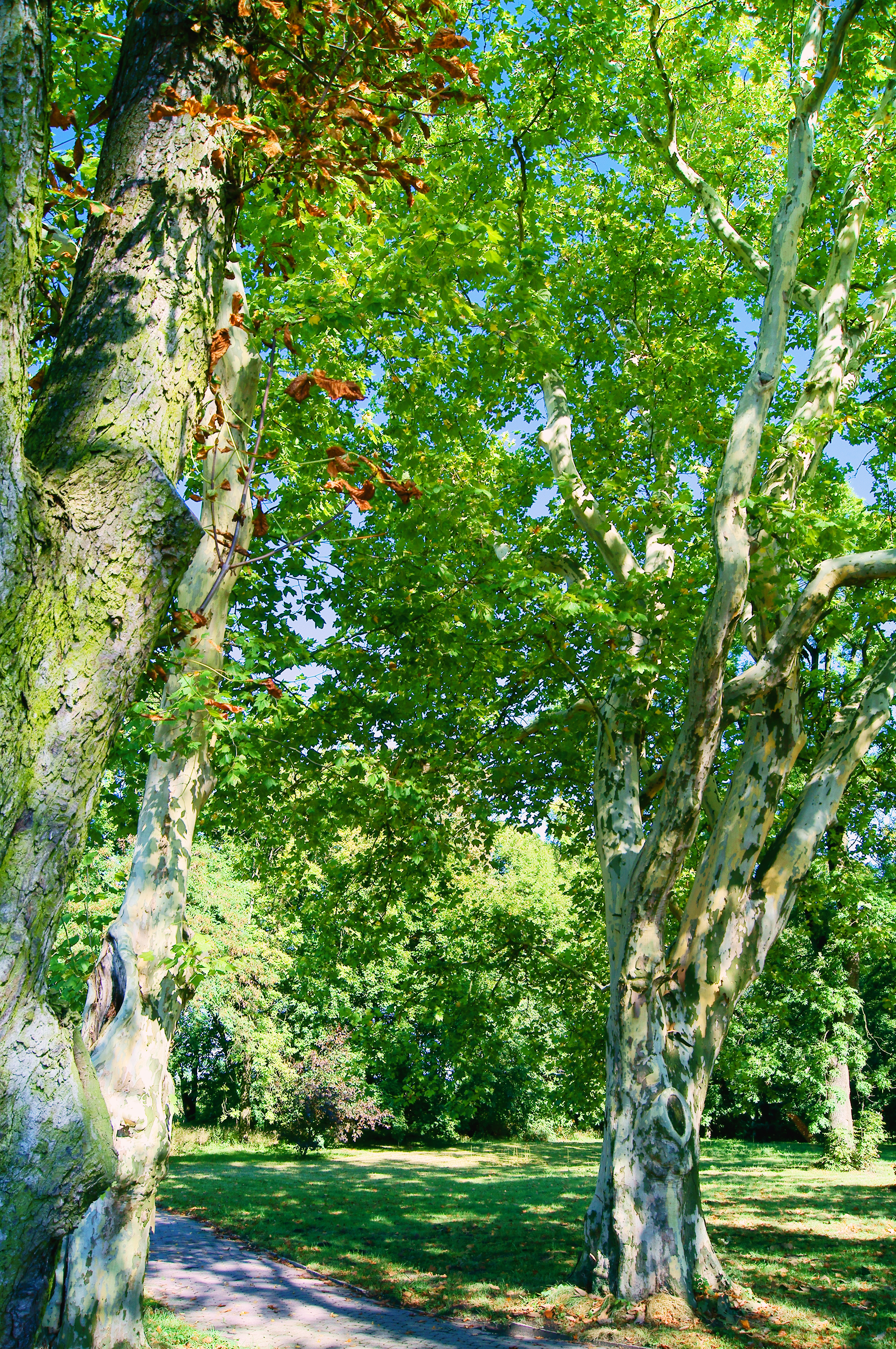
- Park in Rzeżewie

- Location within Poland
- Coordinates: 52°26′18″N 19°05′59″E
- Country: Poland
- Voivodeship: Kuyavian-Pomeranian
- County: Włocławek
- Gmina: Lubień Kujawski

Rzeżewo [ʐɛˈʐɛvɔ] is a village in the administrative district of Gmina Lubień Kujawski, within Włocławek County, Kuyavian-Pomeranian Voivodeship, in north-central Poland.
