= Michał Rawita-Witanowski =

Polish historian and pharmacist

- Born: September 13, 1858; Częstochowa, Warsaw Governorate, Congress Poland
- Died: February 25, 1943 (aged 84); Piotrków Trybunalski, Poland
- Education: University of Warsaw
- Known for: Pharmacist, historian and ethnographer

Michał Rawita-Witanowski (September 13, 1858—February 25, 1943) was a Polish historian and pharmacist.

Michał Rawita-Witanowski was born in Częstochowa and graduated from middle school in Kielce. From 1880 to 1884 he studied pharmacy at the University of Warsaw. From 1890 to 1907 he owned a pharmacy in Kłodawa. In 1907 he moved to Piotrków Trybunalski, where he settled until his death. He was the founder of several local cultural organisations and wrote numerous publications on the history, archaeology, ethnography and geography of Poland.

Both Koło and Kłodawa feature streets named in his honor.
