= Wąwał, Kuyavian-Pomeranian Voivodeship =

Wąwał
- Village
- Location within Poland
- Coordinates: 52°25′N 19°15′E
- Country: Poland
- Voivodeship: Kuyavian-Pomeranian
- County: Włocławek
- Gmina: Lubień Kujawski

Wąwał [ˈvɔ̃vau̯] is a village in the administrative district of Gmina Lubień Kujawski, within Włocławek County, Kuyavian-Pomeranian Voivodeship, in north-central Poland.
