= Kłóbka-Podgórze =

- Village
- Location within Poland
- Coordinates: 52°26′45″N 19°8′25″E
- Country: Poland
- Voivodeship: Kuyavian-Pomeranian
- County: Włocławek
- Gmina: Lubień Kujawski
- Population: 20

Kłóbka-Podgórze [ˈkwupka pɔdˈɡuʐɛ] is a village in the administrative district of Gmina Lubień Kujawski, within Włocławek County, Kuyavian-Pomeranian Voivodeship, in north-central Poland.
