= Morzyce, Włocławek County =

Morzyce
- Village
- Location within Poland
- Coordinates: 52°22′N 19°12′E
- Country: Poland
- Voivodeship: Kuyavian-Pomeranian
- County: Włocławek
- Gmina: Lubień Kujawski

Morzyce [mɔˈʐɨt͡sɛ] is a village in the administrative district of Gmina Lubień Kujawski, within Włocławek County, Kuyavian-Pomeranian Voivodeship, in central Poland.

Two Polish citizens were murdered by Nazi Germany in the village during World War II.
