= Krzewie, Kuyavian-Pomeranian Voivodeship =

Krzewie
- Village
- Location within Poland
- Coordinates: 52°26′N 19°8′E
- Country: Poland
- Voivodeship: Kuyavian-Pomeranian
- County: Włocławek
- Gmina: Lubień Kujawski

Krzewie [ˈkʂɛvjɛ] is a village in the administrative district of Gmina Lubień Kujawski, within Włocławek County, Kuyavian-Pomeranian Voivodeship, in north-central Poland.
