= Krzewie Drugie =

- Village
- Location within Poland
- Coordinates: 52°25′26″N 19°08′04″E
- Country: Poland
- Voivodeship: Kuyavian-Pomeranian
- County: Włocławek
- Gmina: Lubień Kujawski
- Population: 85

Krzewie Drugie [ˈkʂɛvjɛ ˈdruɡʲɛ] is a village in the administrative district of Gmina Lubień Kujawski, within Włocławek County, Kuyavian-Pomeranian Voivodeship, in north-central Poland.In a 2021 consensus, the population of Krzewie Drugie was 85.
