= Maria Wodzińska =

Polish artist

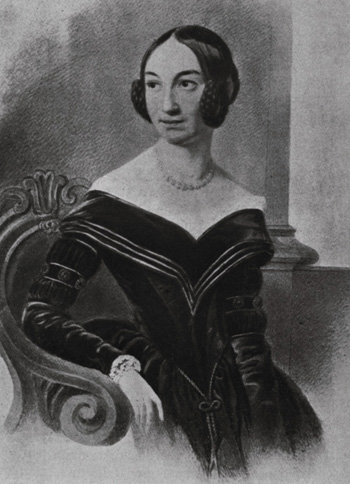
- Wodzińska, by Stanisław Marszałkiewicz, 1840
- Born: 7 January 1819
- Died: 7 December 1896 (aged 77)
- Partner: Frédéric Chopin (1836–1837)

Maria Wodzińska, primo voto Skarbkowa, secundo voto Orpiszewska (7 January 1819 – 7 December 1896), was a Polish artist who was a former fiancée to composer Frédéric Chopin.

== Life ==
Maria Wodzińska was a daughter of Count Wincenty Wodziński and Countess Teresa Wodzińska, of the Jastrzębiec coat of arms. She had three brothers, Antoni, Feliks, and Kazimierz, and a sister, Józefa. The family moved to Geneva in 1832, where Maria was "the brilliant star of the household... striking in every sense". She studied piano with composer John Field and art at the Geneva Academy. Prince Louis-Napoleon (later Napoleon III) was reportedly among those in love with her, as was poet Juliusz Słowacki, who wrote a poem about her. She was described as having "a touch of the Mediterranean about her": olive-toned skin and dark hair and eyes.

She was one of the recipients of Chopin's so-called Farewell Waltz in 1835. She also painted the composer, creating what Tad Szulc called "one of the best portraits of Chopin extant—after that by Delacroix—with the composer looking relaxed, pensive, and at peace". All biographers believe, that in 1836, with the approval of Maria's mother, Maria and Chopin were engaged to be married, but her father objected to the match because of Chopin's poor health, and their relationship ended in 1837. Yet according to the Chopin Institute in Warsaw there is no written proof for this assumption.

On 24 July 1841 she married Józef Skarbek, a son of Fryderyk Skarbek, Frédéric Chopin's godfather after whom Chopin was named. The couple later divorced.

In 1848 she married her first husband's lessee, Władysław Orpiszewski, and they had a son, but the boy died at age four. Her husband died in Florence in 1881, leaving her a widow. She spent the rest of her life in Kłóbka, Poland, at her niece Józefa's. She was interred at Kłóbka, and her artistic and other effects remain at her last home.

Wodzińska's nephew Antoni (1848-1928), son of her brother Feliks (not to be confused with her second brother Antoni (1812-1846) who was a boarder in the Chopin home during Chopin's childhood and lived in Paris when Chopin was there), wrote a book detailing Chopin's relationship with her: Les trois romans de Frédéric Chopin, published in 1886. Frederick Niecks, Chopin's first exhaustive biographer, said the book was "more of the nature of a novel than of a biography". In 1912 he wrote a biography of his aunt, O Marii Wodzińskiej (About Maria Wodzińska), whose first book edition was published in 2015.

== Gallery ==
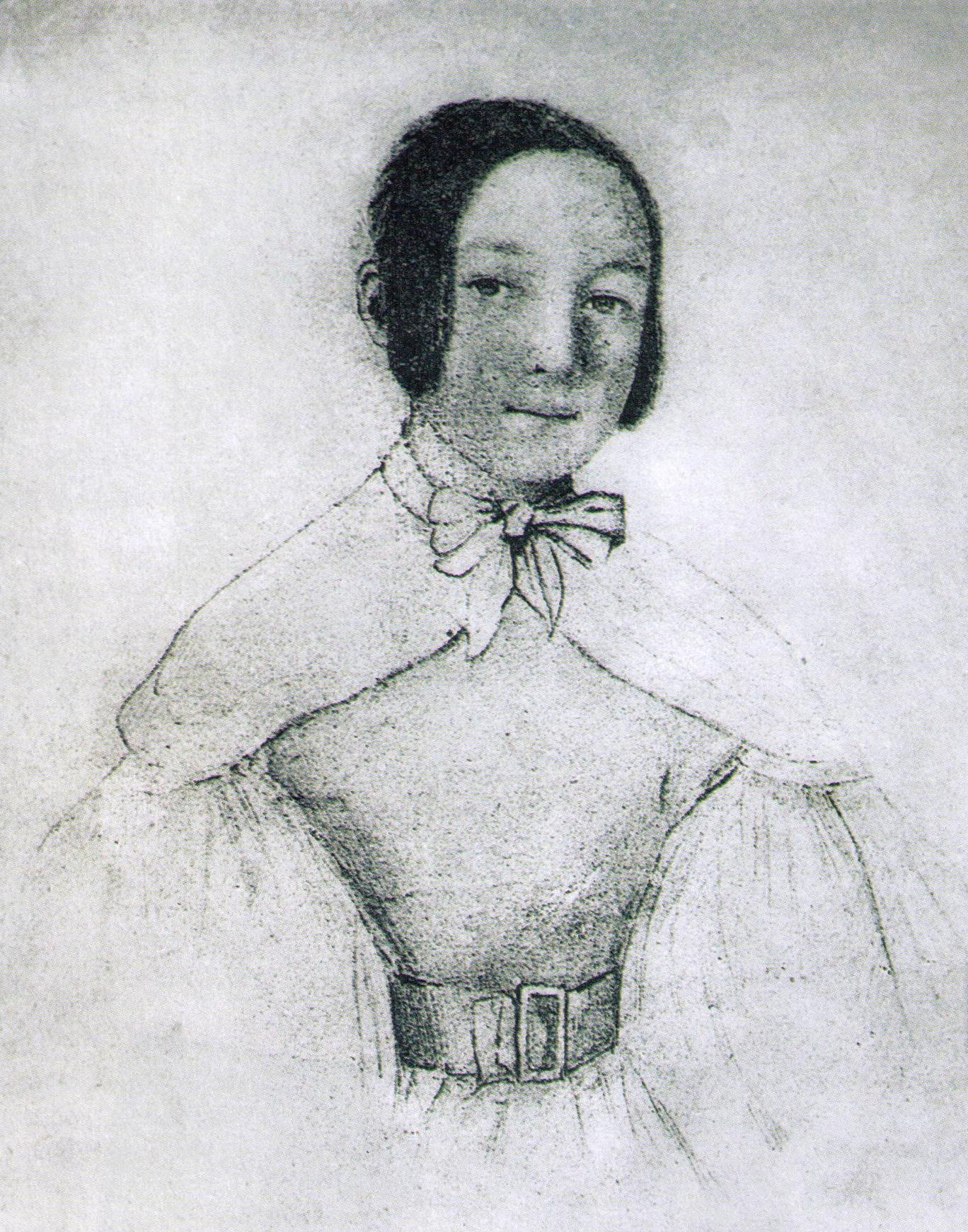
Wodzińska's 1830s self-portrait

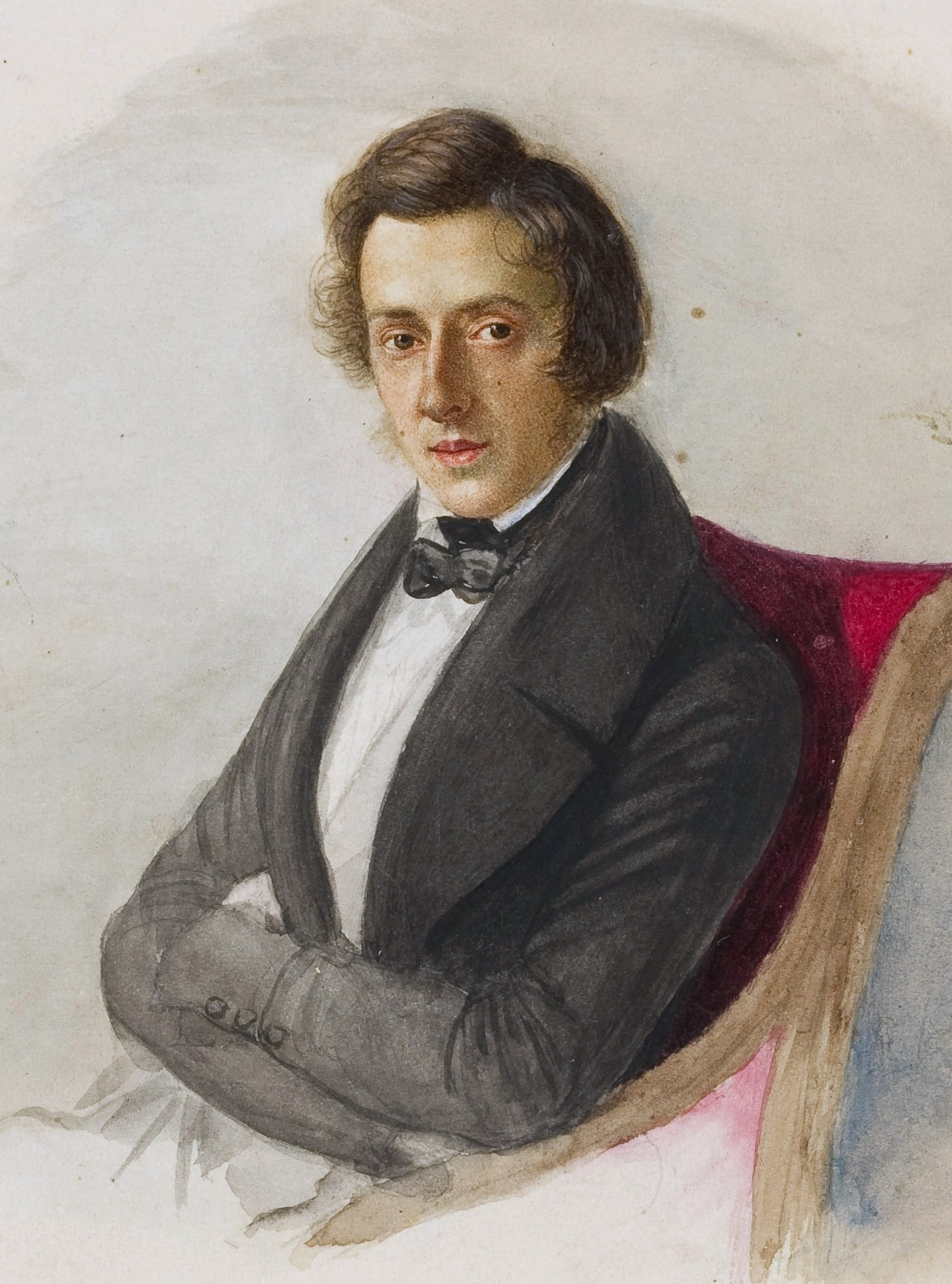
Wodzińska's watercolor of Frédéric Chopin, 1835

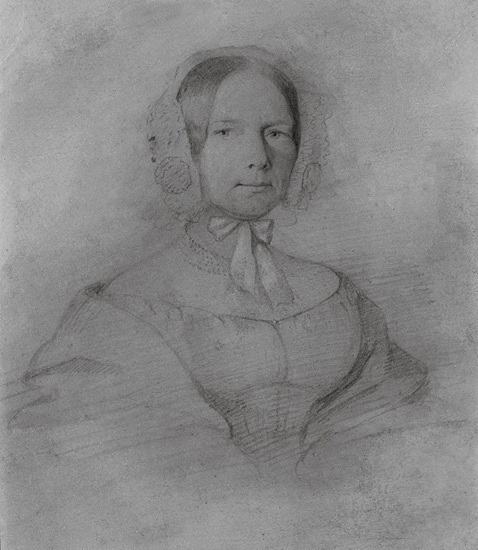
Anna Emilia Wiesiołowska, née Skarbek (1793-1873), sister of Fryderyk Skarbek and godmother of Frédéric Chopin, by Wodzińska

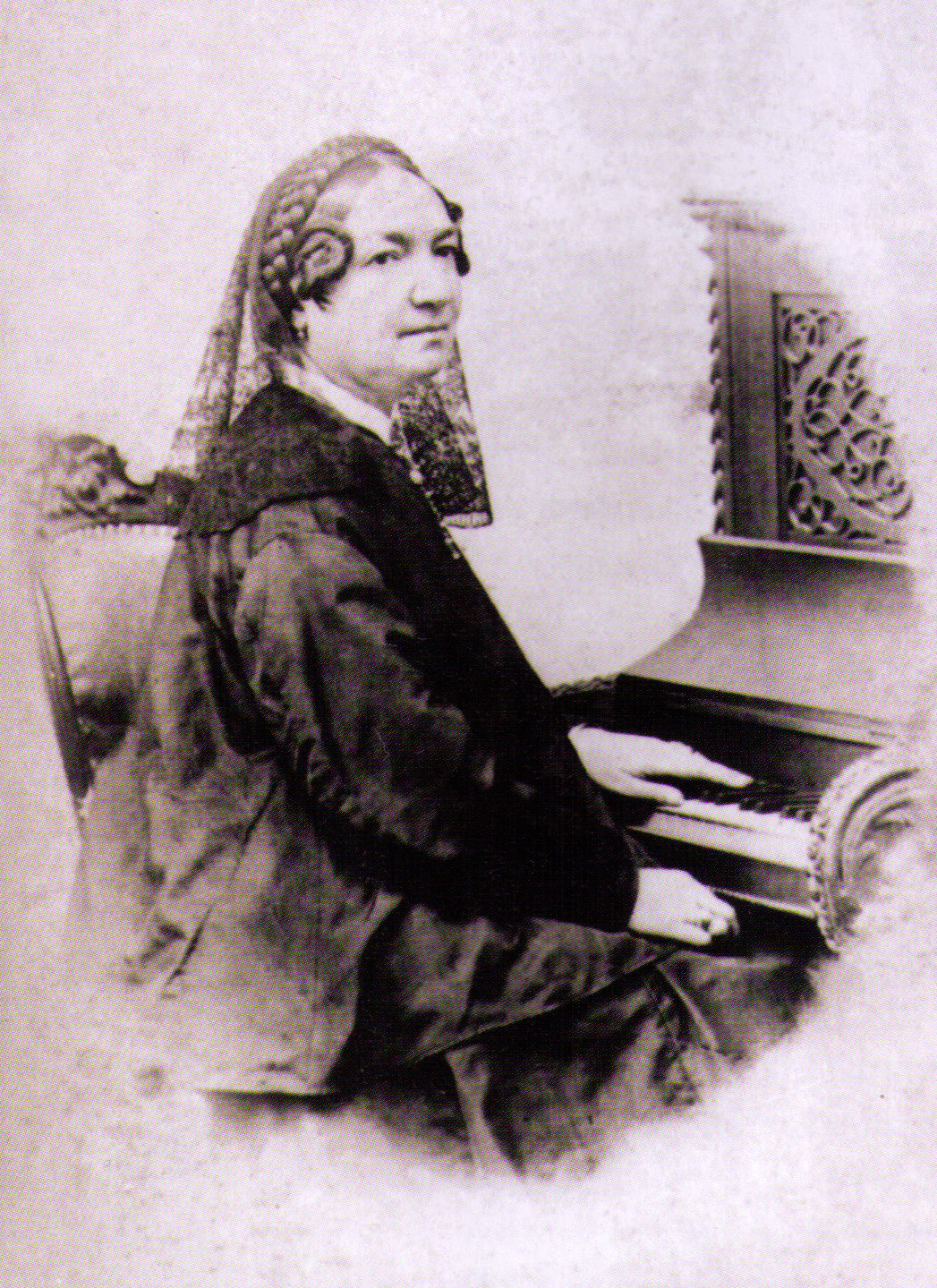
Maria Orpiszewska, née Wodzińska, in later life

== Sources ==
- Azoury, Pierre (1999). Chopin through his contemporaries. Greenwood Press. ISBN 9780313309717.
- Harasowski, Adam (1967). The Skein of Legends Around Chopin. Da Capo Press 1980. ISBN 0306775255.
- Niecks, Frederick (1888). "Frederick Chopin As A Man And A Musician". gutenberg.org.
- Szulc, Tad (2000). Chopin in Paris: the life and times of the romantic composer. Da Capo Press. ISBN 978-0306809330.
- Warszawski, Jean-Marc (2005). "Frédéric Chopin" (in French). musicologie.org.
