= Chwalibogowo, Kuyavian-Pomeranian Voivodeship =

Chwalibogowo
- Village
- Location within Poland
- Coordinates: 52°27′21″N 19°5′28″E
- Country: Poland
- Voivodeship: Kuyavian-Pomeranian
- County: Włocławek
- Gmina: Lubień Kujawski
- Population: 90

Chwalibogowo [xfalibɔˈɡɔvɔ] is a village in the administrative district of Gmina Lubień Kujawski, within Włocławek County, Kuyavian-Pomeranian Voivodeship, in north-central Poland.
