= Lubień Kujawski =

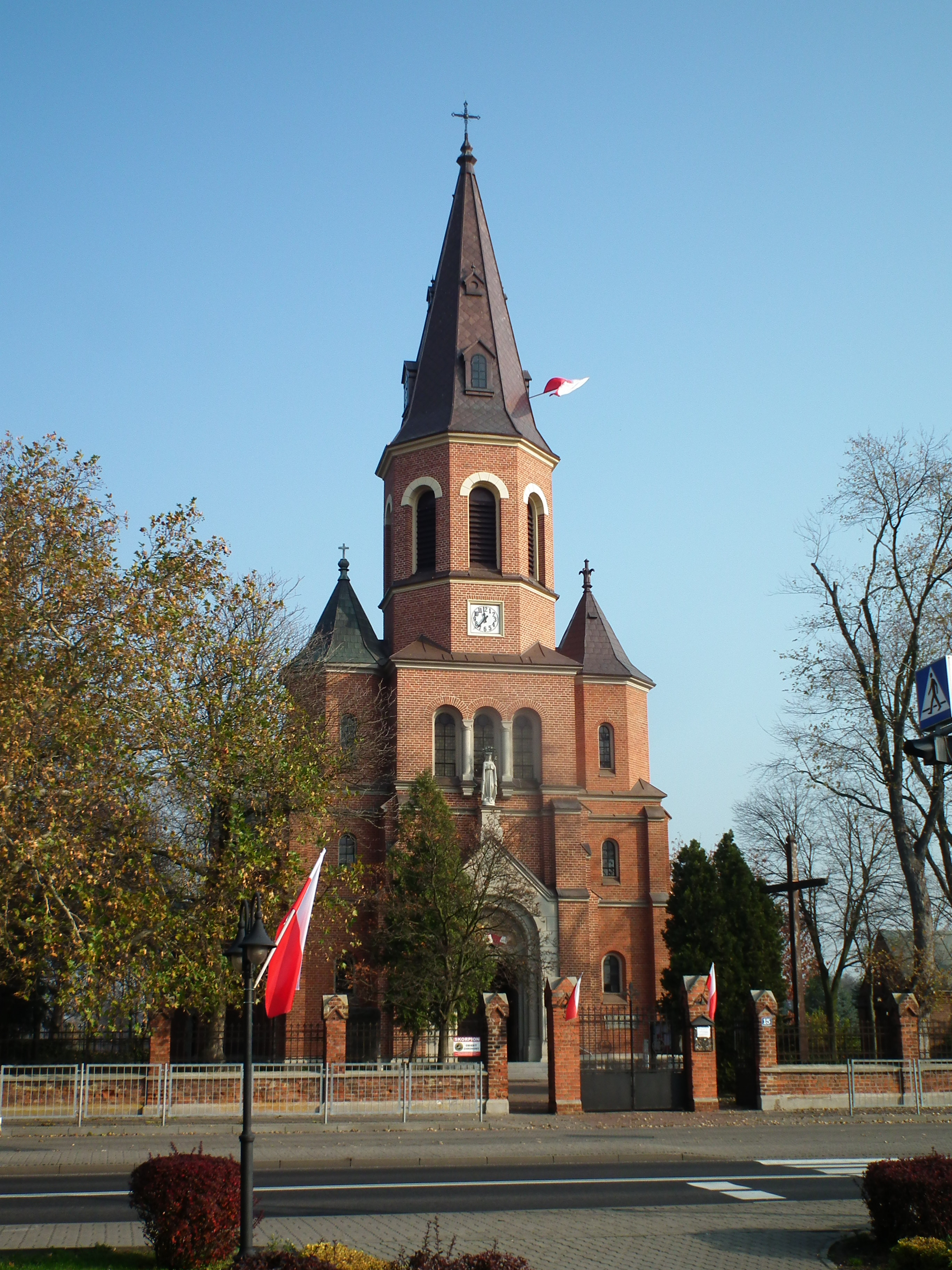
- Sacred Heart Church

- Flag Coat of arms

- Location within Poland
- Coordinates: 52°24′17″N 19°9′53″E
- Country: Poland
- Voivodeship: Kuyavian-Pomeranian
- County: Włocławek
- Gmina: Lubień Kujawski
- Town rights: before 1489

Government
  - Mayor: Marek Wiliński

Area
  - Total: 2.31 km^{2} (0.89 sq mi)

Population (2010)
  - Total: 1,298
  - Density: 562/km^{2} (1,460/sq mi)
- Time zone: UTC+1 (CET)
  - Summer (DST): UTC+2 (CEST)
- Postal code: 87-840
- Number Zone: +48 54
- Website: www.lubienkujawski.pl

Lubień Kujawski (Polish pronunciation: [ˈlubjɛj̃ kuˈjafskʲi]) is a town in Włocławek County, Kuyavian-Pomeranian Voivodeship, in central Poland, with 1,298 inhabitants (2010).

== History ==
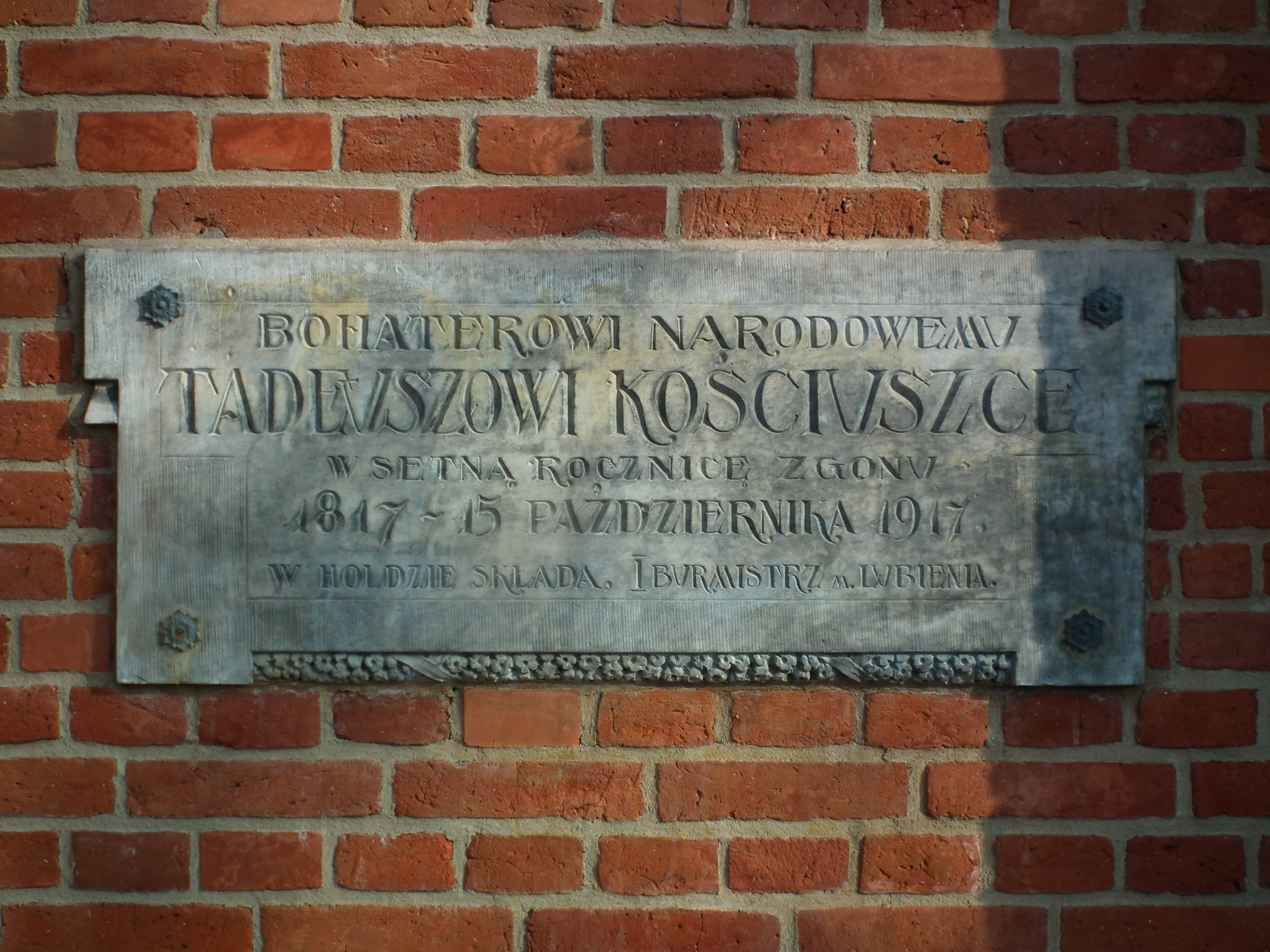
Memorial plaque to Tadeusz Kościuszko from 1917

Lubień was granted town rights before 1489. It was a private town, administratively located in the Kowal County in the Brześć Kujawski Voivodeship in the Greater Poland Province of the Kingdom of Poland.

Following the joint German-Soviet invasion of Poland, which started World War II in September 1939, the town was occupied by Germany until 1945. In July 1940, the German gendarmerie carried out expulsions of 300 Poles, who were deported to the General Government in the more-eastern part of German-occupied Poland, while their houses, shops and workshops were handed over to German colonists as part of the Lebensraum policy.

== Demographics ==
Historical population
Year	Pop.	±%
1860	1,095	—
1921	2,120	+93.6%
1931	2,241	+5.7%
2010	1,298	−42.1%
