= Gocław, Kuyavian-Pomeranian Voivodeship =

Gocław
- Village
- Location within Poland
- Coordinates: 52°25′11″N 19°05′08″E
- Country: Poland
- Voivodeship: Kuyavian-Pomeranian
- County: Włocławek
- Gmina: Lubień Kujawski

Gocław [ˈɡɔt͡swaf] is a village in the administrative district of Gmina Lubień Kujawski, within Włocławek County, Kuyavian-Pomeranian Voivodeship, in north-central Poland.
