= Kłodawa =

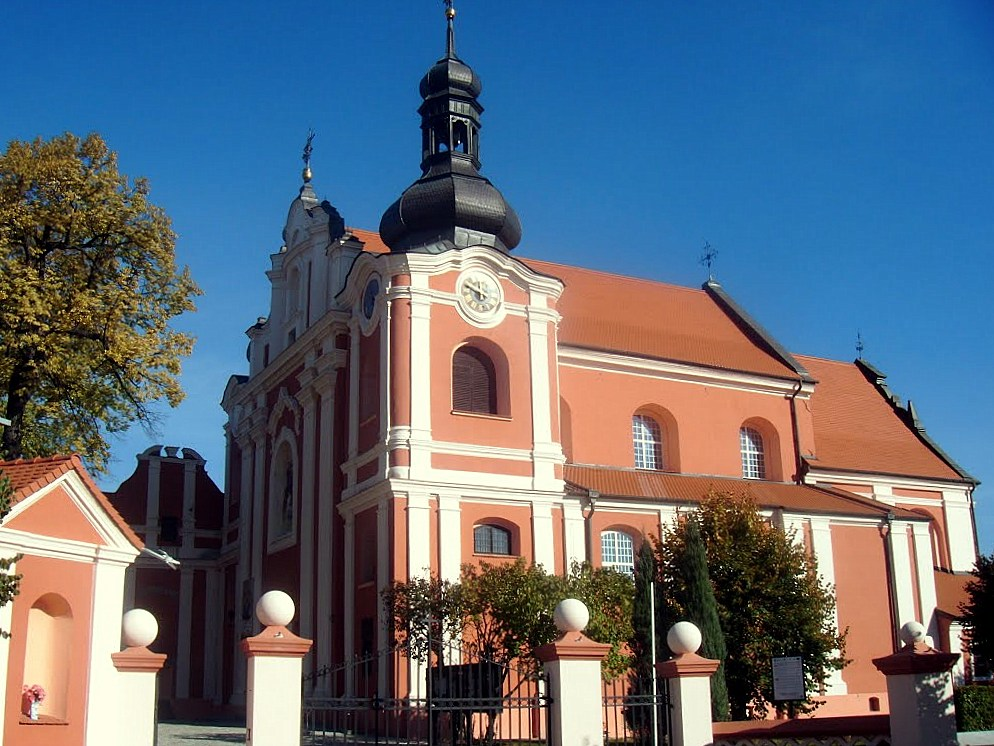
- Church of the Assumption of the Blessed Virgin Mary in Kłodawa, 18th century

- Coat of arms

- Location within Poland
- Coordinates: 52°15′2″N 18°54′56″E
- Country: Poland
- Voivodeship: Greater Poland
- County: Koło
- Gmina: Kłodawa
- Established: 11th century
- Town rights: 1430-1867, 1925

Government
  - Mayor: Piotr Michalak

Area
  - Total: 4.32 km^{2} (1.67 sq mi)

Population (2014)
  - Total: 6,699
  - Density: 1,550/km^{2} (4,020/sq mi)
- Time zone: UTC+1 (CET)
  - Summer (DST): UTC+2 (CEST)
- Postal code: 62-650
- Area code: +48 63
- Vehicle registration: PKL
- Website: https://www.klodawa.eu/

Kłodawa [kwɔˈdava] is a town in the Koło County in the Greater Poland Voivodeship in central Poland with 6,699 inhabitants (2014).

Kłodawa lies on the Rgilewka (a tributary of the Warta River). The town contains the Kłodawa Salt Mine, the largest operating salt mine in Poland, extracting halite and salts of potassium and magnesium.

Kłodawa was settled in the 11th century by craftsmen building the Church of St. Giles. It gained municipal rights in 1430. Much of the town was destroyed in the wars of the 17th century and World War II. It was once home to a vibrant Jewish community wiped out during the German occupation. On the outskirts there is a cemetery from the ancient Lusatian culture.

== History ==
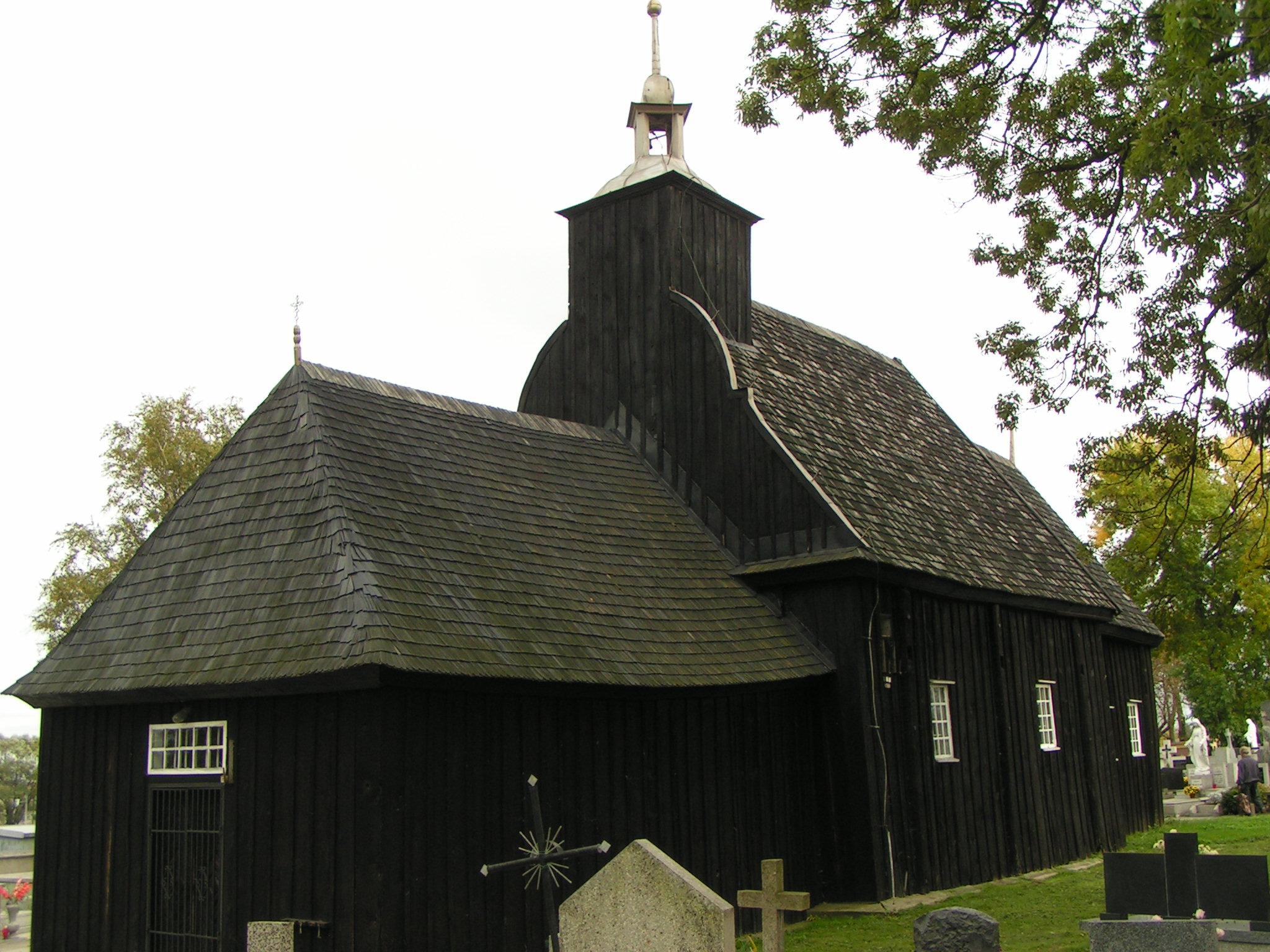
Saints Fabian and Sebastian Church from 1557, surrounded by a cemetery. One of the oldest historical structures in the area

Four thousand-year-old traces of settlements in the area of Kłodawa can be found in the nearby village of Słupeczka. Remains of the Lusatian culture, about 2500 years old, can be found in Old Kłodawa.

In the 11th century, Polish monarch Władysław I Herman erected a church at the site. The settlement's name comes from the Old Polish word kłoda. It gained municipal rights on August 9, 1430, by the decree of King Władysław II Jagiełło. It was a royal city of Poland, administratively located in the Łęczyca County in the Łęczyca Voivodeship in the Greater Poland Province of the Kingdom of Poland. In 1455 King Casimir IV Jagiellon exempted the town from customs duties, contributing to its growth. It was the second largest city of the Łęczyca Voivodeship at the time, just behind Łęczyca. The town was severely damaged in the 1650s by the invading Swedes during "The Deluge". Many of the inhabitants were slaughtered. Despite outside assistance, reconstruction took a very long time. In the 18th century, General Ernest Chryzostom Dorpowski funded a Baroque monastery with the Church of the Assumption of Mary, which remains the most remarkable historic landmark of the town.

Kłodawa was annexed by Prussia after the Second Partition of Poland in 1793. In 1794, it was briefly liberated by Polish insurgents. From 1806 until 1815, the town was part of the Duchy of Warsaw, and Congress Poland in the Russian Partition of Poland afterwards. In 1826, Fryderyk Chopin travelled through the town. During the January Uprising, on July 12, 1863, the Battle of Kłodawa took place, in which 600 Polish insurgents clashed with 1,200 Russian soldiers. In 1867, Kłodawa lost its municipal charter, as part of Russian repressions after the unsuccessful January Uprising. During World War I, the town was occupied by Germany from 1914 to 1918. After a skirmish between the occupying Germans and local Poles, the town was liberated in November 1918 and restored to reborn Poland, within which in 1925 it regained its town charter. According to the 1921 census, the population was 74.1% Polish and 25.7% Jewish.

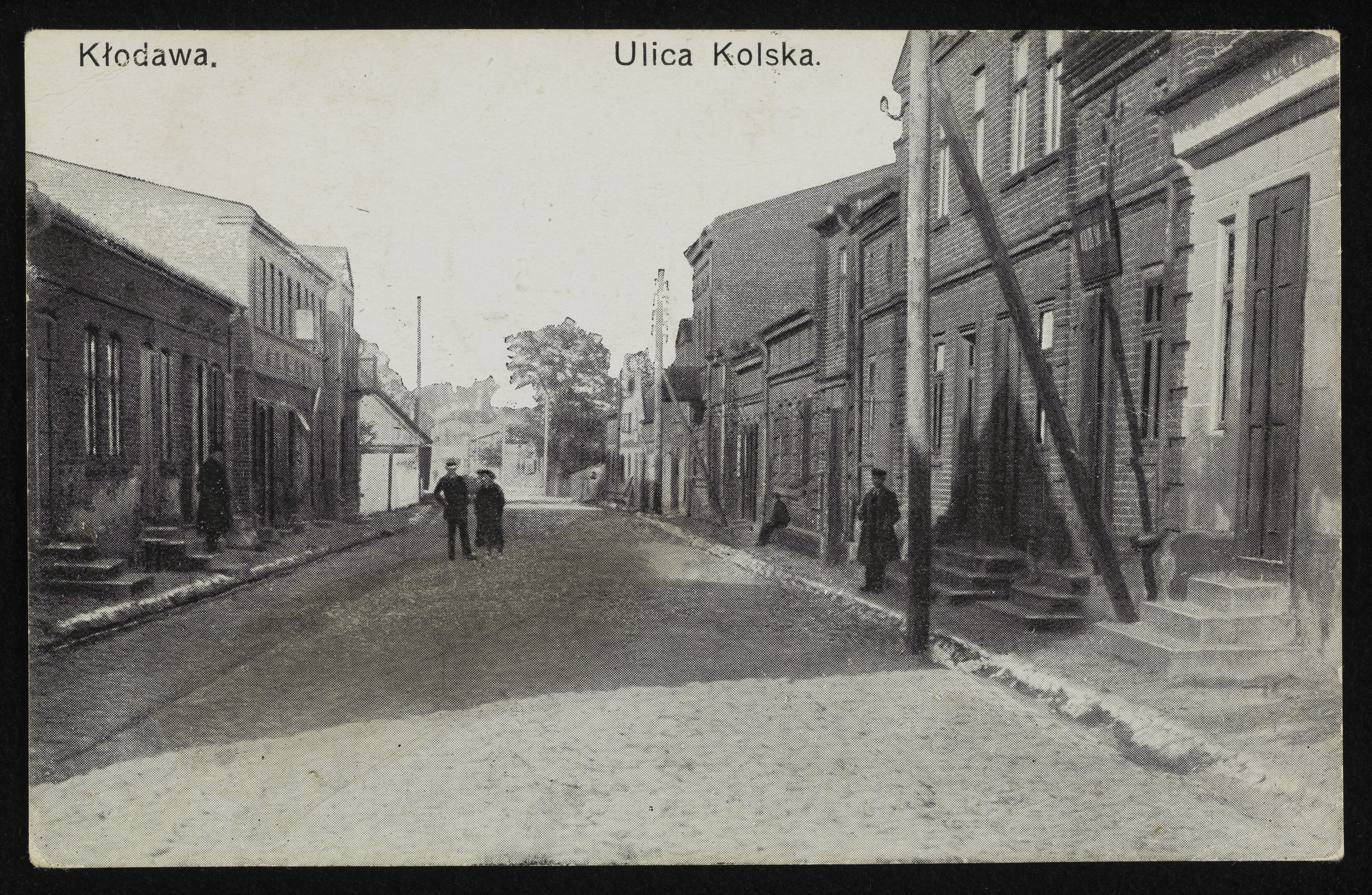
Kolska Street in 1918

Following the German invasion of Poland, which started World War II in September 1939, the SS-Totenkopf-Standarte Brandenburg entered the town to commit various crimes against the population. Already in late September 1939, the Germans murdered Polish hostages from Kłodawa in the nearby Rzuchów forest, and one of the pre-war mayors, Władysław Zalewski, was murdered in November 1939 in Środa Wielkopolska. During the occupation by Nazi Germany, the town was renamed Tonningen (1940–1945). In 1940, the Polish underground resistance movement was formed in the town, and secret Polish schooling was organized. In 1941, more than 1,500 Kłodawan Jews were killed by the Nazi Germans in the Chełmno extermination camp. In 1943, the Germans arrested some of the local Polish resistance members, who were then either sentenced to death or prison. The Kłodawa parish priest, Father Teofil Choynowski, was killed in the Dachau concentration camp in 1943. Kłodawa was eventually liberated on January 19, 1945 by the Red Army, and restored to Poland.

From 1975 to 1998, it was administratively located in the Konin Voivodeship.

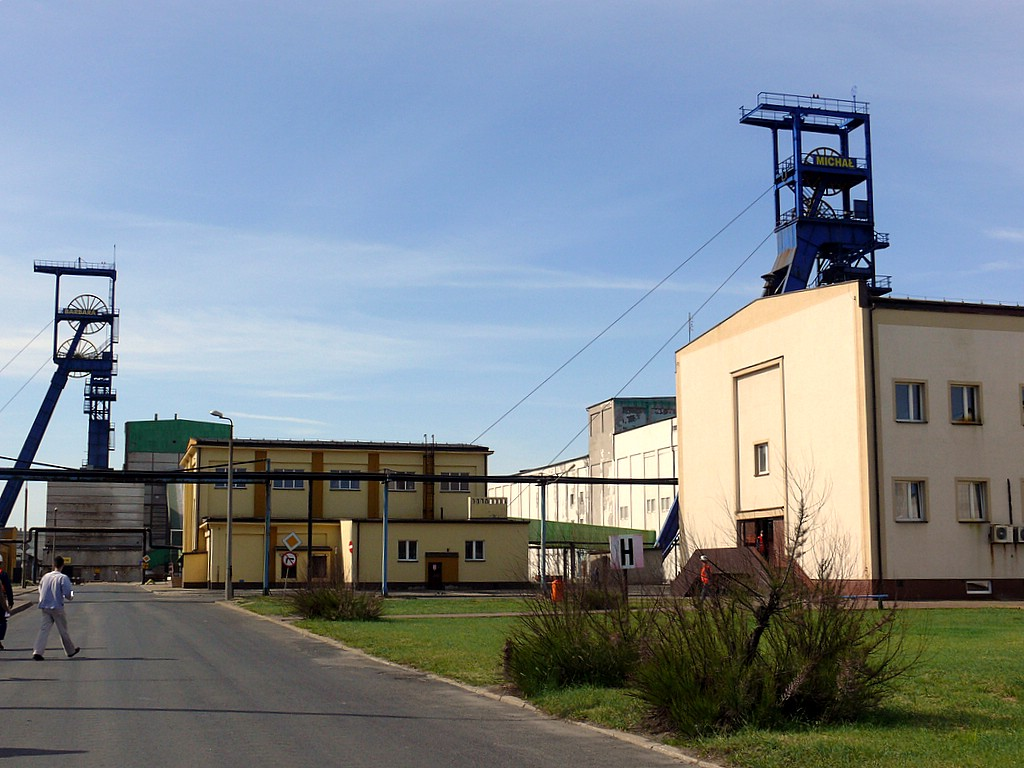
Kłodawa Salt Mine

== Sport ==
The local football club is Górnik Kłodawa. It competes in the lower leagues.

== Notable residents ==
- Paweł Włodkowic of Brudzeń (c. 1370–1435)—medieval scholar and diplomat. Parish priest of the Church of St. Giles in Kłodawa, Retired here in 1424.
- Michał Rawita-Witanowski (1858–1943)—pharmacist, historian and ethnographer. Owned a pharmacy in Kłodawa. Wrote about the history of the region in several publications.
- Aaron Kosminski (1865–1919)—Jack the Ripper suspect
- Andrzej Ruciński (born 1958)—member of Sejm

== Distance and driving time to regional cities ==
- Koło—20 km (10 mi)—about 20 minutes
- Konin—50 km (30 mi)—about 45 minutes
- Włocławek—50 km (30 mi)—about 45 minutes
- Łódź—65 km (40 mi)— about 1 hours
- Toruń—110 km (70 mi)—about 1.5 hours
- Bydgoszcz—150 km (95 mi)—about 2 hours
- Poznań—150 km (95 mi)—about 2 hours
- Warsaw—150 km (95 mi)—about 2 hours
