= Nowe Czaple, Kuyavian-Pomeranian Voivodeship =

Nowe Czaple
- Village
- Location within Poland
- Coordinates: 52°23′18″N 19°11′51″E
- Country: Poland
- Voivodeship: Kuyavian-Pomeranian
- County: Włocławek
- Gmina: Lubień Kujawski

Nowe Czaple [ˈnɔvɛ ˈt͡ʂaplɛ] is a village in the administrative district of Gmina Lubień Kujawski, within Włocławek County, Kuyavian-Pomeranian Voivodeship, in north-central Poland.
