= Rutkowice, Kuyavian-Pomeranian Voivodeship =

Rutkowice
- Village
- Location within Poland
- Coordinates: 52°21′57″N 19°09′52″E
- Country: Poland
- Voivodeship: Kuyavian-Pomeranian
- County: Włocławek
- Gmina: Lubień Kujawski

Rutkowice [rutkɔˈvit͡sɛ] is a village in the administrative district of Gmina Lubień Kujawski, within Włocławek County, Kuyavian-Pomeranian Voivodeship, in north-central Poland.
