= Henryk Mania =

Polish laborer and collaborator of Nazi Germany

- Born: January 17, 1923; Rakoniewice
- Died: April 13, 2020 (aged 97); Szczecin
- Resting place: Central Cemetery in Szczecin
- Honours: Cross of Merit

Henryk Mania (born 17 January 1923 in Rakoniewice, died 13 April 2020 in Szczecin) was a Polish laborer and collaborator of Nazi Germany, who served as a kapo in the Chełmno extermination camp. In 2001, he was sentenced to eight years in prison for his involvement in the operation of the camp. He was the first Pole to be convicted by a Polish court for participation in Nazi crimes, in a trial where the prosecutor was from the Institute of National Remembrance.

== Biography ==
=== Pre-war period ===
Henryk Mania was born on 17 January 1923 in Rakoniewice, in a peasant family. He was the son of Władysław and Agnieszka (née Przymuszała). He had three siblings: two brothers and a sister.

Mania had a primary education and worked as a roofer's assistant. When Nazi Germany invaded Poland, he was training as a machinist.

=== Imprisonment and work in the Sonderkommando Lange ===
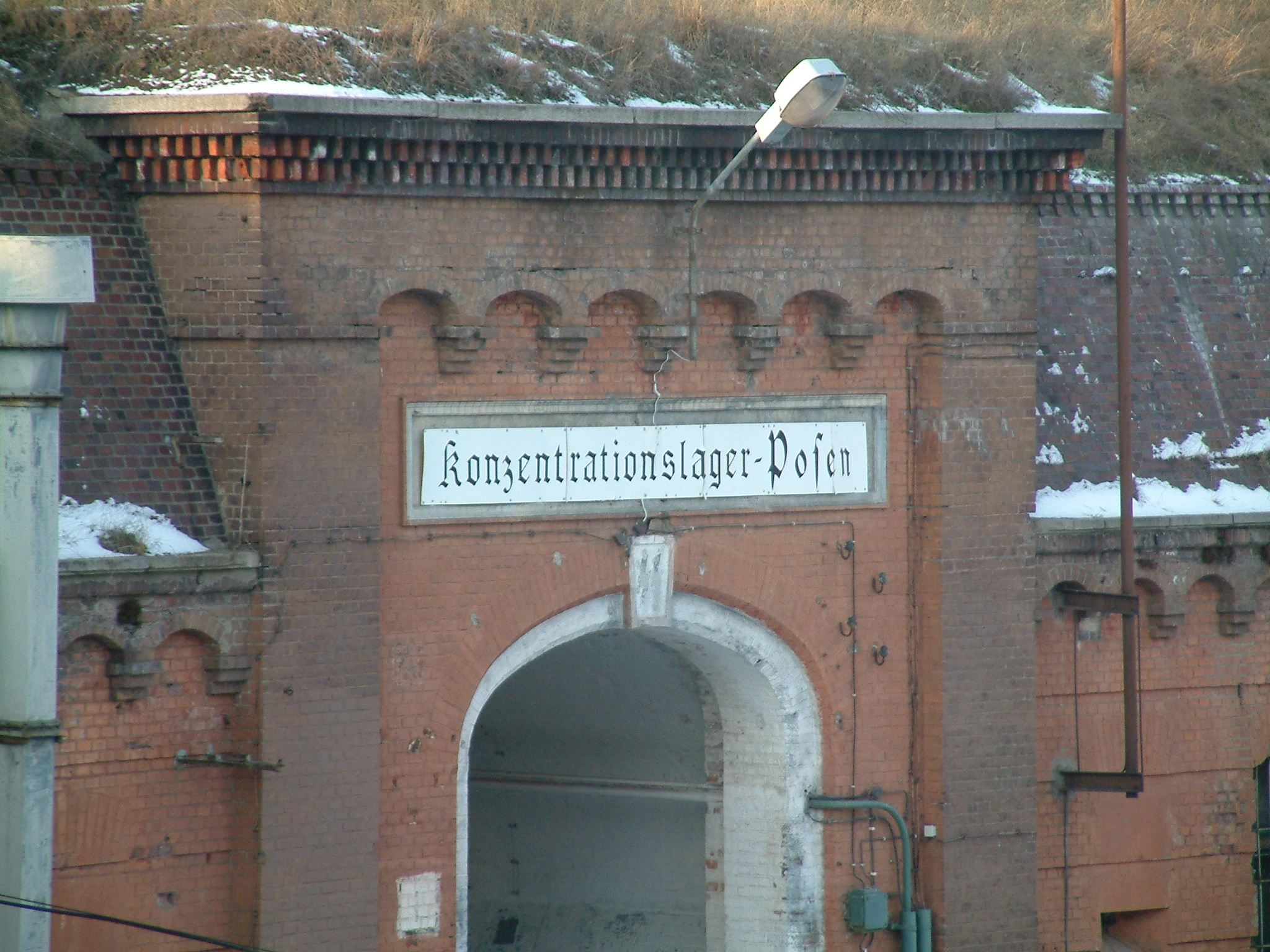
Gate of Fort VII in Poznań, where Henryk Mania was imprisoned

Shortly after the German occupation began, Mania was accused of attempting to poison a German soldier and was arrested. Initially, he was imprisoned in a camp in Wolsztyn, where he was forced to work for several weeks repairing roads and railway tracks. Later, along with a group of prisoners from Wolsztyn, he was transferred to Fort VII in Poznań. Most of his companions soon died or were murdered.

Mania, along with several other Polish prisoners, was assigned to the Sonderkommando Lange, a special SS unit led by SS-Untersturmführer Herbert Lange, tasked with exterminating the mentally ill and disabled in the Reichsgau Wartheland. When transports of patients arrived at Fort VII, Mania and his fellow prisoners were responsible for leading the victims to the bunker-gas chamber, sealing its doors, and eventually carrying the bodies to vehicles. The mass murder experiments using carbon monoxide conducted by Lange at Fort VII lasted for about a month. The Sonderkommando then proceeded to exterminate patients at various hospitals and care facilities across the Reichsgau Wartheland (in Dziekanka, Kościan, Gostynin, Kochanówka, Śrem, and Warta). Lange had a group of 13 Polish gravediggers at his disposal, although eight of them, including Mania, were most often taken by the SS for operations outside of Poznań.

In late May or early June 1940, the Sonderkommando Lange was sent to the Soldau concentration camp, where SS members murdered 1,558 psychiatric patients from East Prussia. Mania and his 12 companions worked on burying the bodies. The Sonderkommando then suspended its activities for nearly a year, and the Polish gravediggers were once again imprisoned at Fort VII.

At one point, Lange visited the eight Polish prisoners in their cell at Fort VII and, displeased with their poor physical condition, provided them with additional food, explaining that they needed to regain their strength for a new task. In June 1941, the reactivated Sonderkommando Lange resumed the murder of mentally ill patients in the Reichsgau Wartheland, with Mania and his companions once again forced to work as gravediggers.

In September of that year, with the suspension of Aktion T4 and the start of preparations for the "final solution to the Jewish question", the Sonderkommando was transferred to Konin. In the autumn of 1941, in the forests between Niesłusz and Rudzica, and later in the Wygoda forests near Kazimierz Biskupi, the unit members murdered Jews from ghettos in the Konin County, experimenting with various methods of mass murder (including the use of quicklime). By the end of October, they were sent to Kalisz, where they massacred the residents of a Jewish nursing home. During these operations, Mania and his companions dug mass graves, buried the bodies of the victims, and searched their clothes for valuables. The Sonderkommando, with the Polish prisoners, was then sent to Chełmno nad Nerem, where Lange began organizing a permanent extermination camp.

=== Kulmhof ===
The Chełmno extermination camp (Kulmhof) began operations on 7 December 1941, with the arrival of the first transport from Koło. Mania, along with seven companions – Lech Jaskólski, Marian Libelt, Henryk Maliczak, Franciszek Piekarski, Stanisław Polubiński, Kajetan Skrzypczyński, and Stanisław Szymański – was accommodated on the ground floor of a ruined palace. Their first task was to erect a fence around the building and to build a wooden ramp. Maliczak and Szymański primarily handled this work, while Mania and the other five worked on digging mass graves in the Rzuchów Forest. The SS gave Mania the nickname "Heinrich the Younger" (to distinguish him from "Heinrich the Elder" – Henryk Maliczak).

When mass extermination of Jews began at the camp, Mania's main task became collecting money and valuables that the victims had to surrender as a supposed "deposit", and then issuing them "receipts". He also facilitated taking victims to the palace cellars, and if they resisted, he would, along with three companions, push them into gas vans. He often used a whip during this process. He was also responsible for supervising the burying of bodies. After the war, he claimed to have witnessed the arrival of a transport of Czech children from the pacified village of Lidice to the camp for extermination. When six Jews escaped from the camp during the night of 15/16 May 1942, Mania participated in the chase with Polish functional prisoners. He claimed that he acted as a translator, and the group he was with did not catch any of the escapees.

Although the eight Poles were still formally prisoners, in practice, they had already obtained a status similar to unskilled laborers (the so-called Hilfsarbeiter). The SS even allowed them a certain level of familiarity. They wore civilian clothing and could move relatively freely around the nearby villages, where they maintained social relationships with local Poles. Occasionally, the Germans would take them along for meals at restaurants. They did not receive any money for their work but were given regular rations of vodka. An additional source of income came from the money and valuables belonging to the Jews, which they secretly stole from the Germans. According to post-war testimonies from one of the SS men, they were also allowed to sexually exploit young Jewish women taken from the transports on several occasions.

Mania remained in the camp until 7 January 1943. During the process of dismantling the camp, he was accidentally shot in the leg by a drunken SS man. He was taken to a hospital in Koło, from where, after treatment, he was sent back to Fort VII in Poznań.

=== Final period of the war ===
In November 1943, along with three companions from Kulmhof – Lech Jaskólski, Henryk Maliczak, and Kajetan Skrzypczyński – Mania was assigned to Sonderkommando Legath (also known as Wetterkommando). This was a special SS unit tasked with erasing evidence of the crimes committed by the Germans in the Reichsgau Wartheland. Mania and the other Poles were responsible for overseeing around 50 Jewish prisoners, who performed work related to exhuming and burning corpses. Additionally, they helped locate mass graves, most of which they had dug themselves between 1940 and 1941. Wetterkommando completed its work in the spring of 1944. The Jewish prisoners were then shot, while Mania and the other three Poles were returned to Fort VII, from where they were later transferred to the penal and investigative camp in Żabikowo.

Later, on 23 June 1944, Mania was transported to the Auschwitz concentration camp. Piotr Litka and Grzegorz Pawlikowski report that he did not receive a camp number and was likely not even treated as a prisoner. Patrick Montague provides a different account, stating that Mania was assigned the camp number 189 229 at Auschwitz.

On 4 July 1944, Mania was transferred to the Mauthausen concentration camp in Austria, where he received the camp number 78 441. Five days later, he was moved to one of the subcamps (Linz III), where he remained until he was liberated by American forces.

He was one of the four Polish functionary prisoners from the Kulmhof extermination camp who survived the war.

=== Post-war life ===
After liberation, Mania returned to his hometown of Wolsztyn. However, former prisoners of Fort VII soon began spreading rumors that he had survived imprisonment due to collaboration with the Germans. In response, he moved to Poznań and later to Szczecin.

In Szczecin, he started a family (having a son and a daughter). He found employment first at the Municipal, and later at the Regional Water Supply and Sewerage Company. In 1957, he was transferred to the military reserve force with the rank of private. He was a valued and frequently rewarded employee. On 22 July 1959, he was awarded the Bronze Cross of Merit. On 1 January 1982, he retired. Despite being imprisoned in various camps and prisons during the occupation, he never applied for benefits granted to victims of Nazi repression.

Meanwhile, in 1949, a resident of Kalisz who had worked as a driver in Koło during the war met a new business partner in Poznań with the surname Mania. When questioned by the man from Kalisz, Mania denied having been in Koło during the war. However, the man grew suspicious and reported the matter to Milicja Obywatelska. An investigation revealed that it was a coincidence of surnames, but it was the first time that the authorities took notice of the real Henryk Mania. In 1953, an investigation into his wartime activities began, but after three years, the investigators concluded that there was insufficient evidence of his collaboration with the Germans. In 1957, it was established that he had been part of the Kulmhof camp crew, and several witnesses provided incriminating testimony against him. Nevertheless, the case was ultimately shelved.

In 1962, a correspondent for the Czechoslovak newspaper Rudé právo requested permission from the Polish Milicja Obywatelska to interview Mania and Henryk Maliczak. The interviews, conducted in August 1962 in the presence of a Milicja Obywatelska officer, concerned the murder of children from Lidice (the texts of these interviews have not survived). This case reignited the authorities' interest. On 14 November 1963, the Security Service in Poznań initiated a pre-investigation inquiry under the August Decree, focusing on the activities of Mania, Maliczak, and other Polish workers at the Kulmhof camp. Mania and Maliczak were interrogated. Ultimately, on 14 April 1964, the Security Service officer decided to discontinue the investigation, a decision later upheld by the Provincial Prosecutor in Poznań on 30 April 1964. The justification for the decision was the passage of time, the deaths of many witnesses, or the inability to question them as they had emigrated to Israel (including Mordechaï Żurawski, Mordechaï Podchlebnik, and Szymon Srebrnik), as well as the lack of evidence of a crime.

In 1967, Mania was interrogated again, this time as part of an investigation into the extermination of the mentally ill in the Reichsgau Wartheland. He was questioned once more in February 1977, this time regarding his arrest and imprisonment in Wolsztyn at the beginning of the occupation.

=== Trial and conviction ===
On 28 August 1991, the Chief Commission for the Prosecution of Crimes against the Polish Nation initiated an investigation into the activities of Polish functionary prisoners at the Kulmhof extermination camp. In 1995, Mania accompanied investigators during a site inspection of the former extermination camp. The investigation was suspended again on 26 January 1999, reportedly for procedural reasons. It was resumed on 1 September 2000.

It was not until 2 November 2000 that Henryk Mania was arrested by police at one of Szczecin’s cemeteries. The next day, the District Court in Poznań imposed preventive detention, (Note: There were rumors that Mania had managed to avoid charges for many years because the son of one of his comrades from Kulmhof was allegedly a high-ranking official in the Ministry of Justice of the Polish People's Republic after the war. However, no evidence was ever found to confirm these rumors (Montague (2014, p. 308)).) and Mania was placed in custody in Poznań. On 16 March 2001, Zygmunt Kacprzak, a prosecutor from the Branch Commission for the Prosecution of Crimes against the Polish Nation in Poznań, filed an indictment against Mania, accusing him, under the August Decree, of complicity in genocide. The charges included beating prisoners, confiscating their valuables, clothing, and personal belongings, and leading them to the gas chambers. Mania pleaded not guilty, claiming he was a prisoner and followed German orders out of fear for his own life and that of his family. He also denied using physical violence against prisoners, stating that his tasks involved searching victims' bodies and transporting wood for burning corpses in the Rzuchów Forest.

On 6 July 2001, the District Court in Konin found Mania guilty of the charges and sentenced him to eight years in prison. Both the prosecutor and the defense attorney appealed the verdict, but the Court of Appeal in Poznań upheld the sentence. The defense then filed a cassation appeal to the Supreme Court, which also upheld the sentence. Due to Mania’s deteriorating health, the execution of the sentence was postponed. His family and defense team appealed to the Ombudsman and repeatedly petitioned President Aleksander Kwaśniewski for clemency. This was the first final conviction in which a prosecutor from the investigative division of the Institute of National Remembrance acted as the accuser.

Since Mania did not report to serve his sentence, he was arrested on 1 December 2005 and placed in custody in Szczecin. On 13 January 2006, the court granted a suspension of the sentence due to his health condition. Mania was required to regularly submit medical certificates, but he never returned to prison.

Henryk Mania died on 13 April 2020 and was buried three days later at the Central Cemetery in Szczecin.

Mania’s testimony from interrogations in the 1960s and 2000 was first published in 2014 in Patrick Montague’s book Chełmno. Pierwszy nazistowski obóz zagłady (Chełmno. The First Nazi Extermination Camp).

== In culture ==
In 2003, artist Rafał Jakubowicz painted Henryk M. from the Zugzwang series, a monochromatic portrait of Mania. The series refers to the history of the Chełmno extermination camp, and the portrait of Mania alludes to the Poznań court's verdict issued in February 2002.

== Bibliography ==
- Szczesiak-Ślusarek, M. (2012). "Zagłada kolskich Żydów" [The Extermination of the Jews of Koło]. In Witkowski, K. (ed.). Z dziejów Żydów kolskich – w 70. rocznicę Zagłady w obozie zagłady Kulmhof [From the History of the Jews of Koło – On the 70th Anniversary of the Extermination at the Kulmhof Death Camp] (in Polish). Koło: Urząd Miejski w Kole. ISBN 978-83-62485-66-6.
- Litka, P.; Pawlikowski, G. (2016). "Henryk Mania – ostatni Polak skazany za współudział w zbrodni Holocaustu" [Henryk Mania – The Last Pole Convicted for Complicity in the Crime of the Holocaust]. In Malczyńska-Biały, M.; Pawlikowski, G.; Żarna, K. (eds.). Zjawisko ludobójstwa w XX i XXI wieku [The Phenomenon of Genocide in the 20th and 21st Centuries] (in Polish). Rzeszów: Wydawnictwo Uniwersytetu Rzeszowskiego. ISBN 978-83-7996-321-8.
- Montague, P. (2014). Chełmno. Pierwszy nazistowski obóz zagłady [Chełmno: The First Nazi Death Camp] (in Polish). Wołowiec: Wydawnictwo Czarne. ISBN 978-83-7536-726-3.
