= Chełmno trials =

Series of war crimes trials

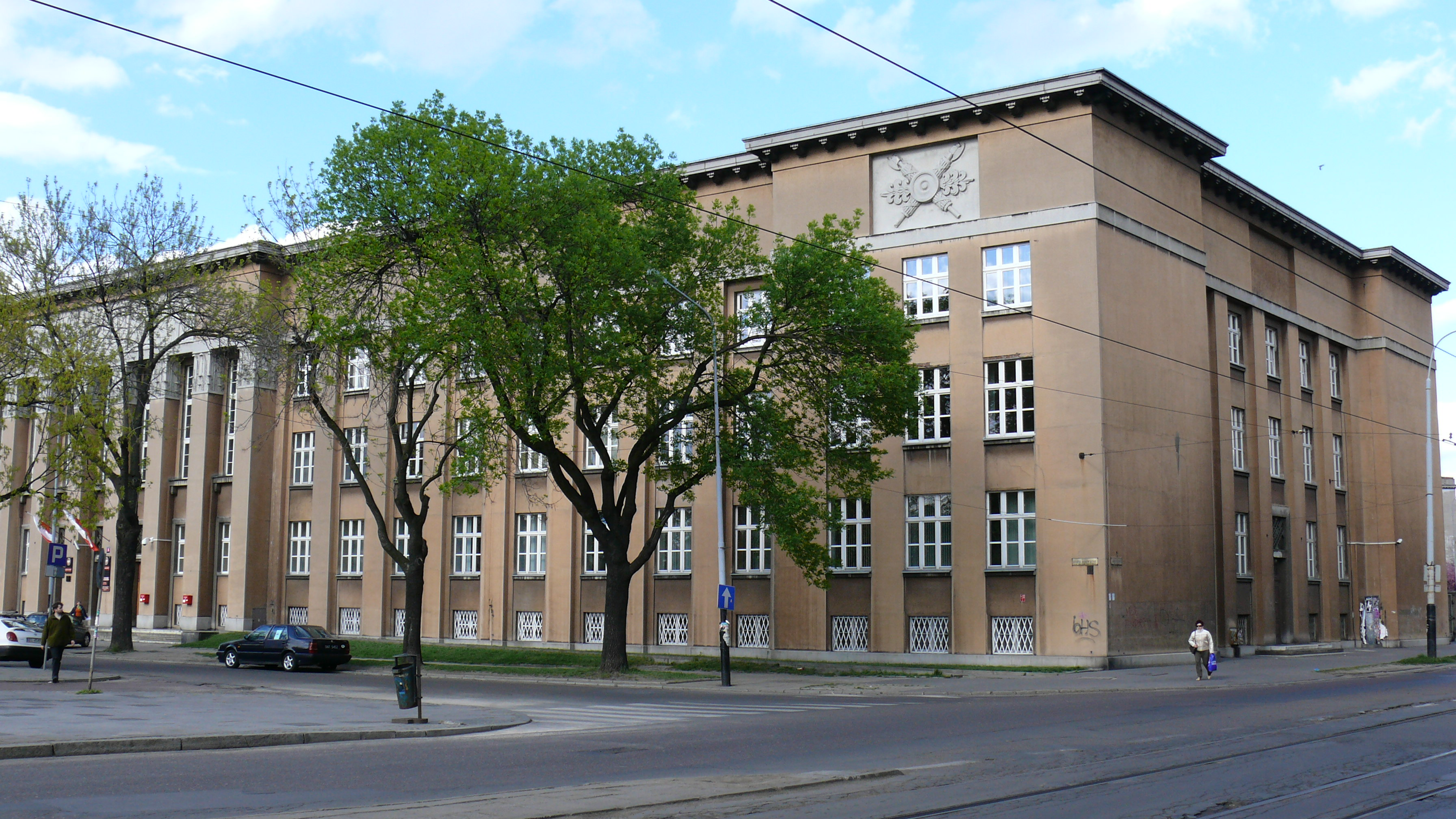
- The Łódź courthouse, built in 1927–32 during the Poland's Interbellum. Location of the first trial, 2007 photo.
- Submitted: May 24, 1945, Łódź
- Decided: Last case: 1965, Cologne

The Chełmno trials were a series of consecutive war-crime trials of the Chełmno extermination camp personnel, held in Poland and in Germany following World War II. The cases were decided almost twenty years apart. The first judicial trial of the former SS men – members of the SS-Sonderkommando Kulmhof – took place in 1945 at the District Court in Łódź, Poland. The subsequent four trials, held in Bonn, Germany, began in 1962 and concluded three years later, in 1965 in Cologne.

A number of camp officials, gas-van operators and SS guards, were arraigned before the court on charges of war crimes and crimes against humanity committed at Chełmno (a.k.a. Kulmhof) in occupied Poland in the period between December 1941 and January 1945. The evidence against the accused, including testimonies by surviving witnesses, former prisoners, and mechanics attending to repair needs of the SS, was examined in Poland by Judge Władysław Bednarz of the Łódź District Court (Sąd Okręgowy w Łodzi). Three convicted defendants were sentenced to death, including the camp deputy commandant Oberscharführer Walter Piller (wrongly, Filer); the gas van operator Hauptscharführer Hermann Gielow (Gilow), as well as Bruno Israel from Ordnungspolizei (Order Police), his sentence was later commuted to life. All three were members of the SS Special Detachment Kulmhof responsible for the extermination of Jews and non-Jews during the Holocaust in occupied Poland.

In the years 1962–65, a dozen SS-men from Kulmhof were arraigned before the German court (Landgericht) in Bonn, RFN. They were charged with the murder of 180,000 Jews in the camp. The jury deliberations continued for three years, with sentences ranging from 13 months and 2 weeks to 13 years' imprisonment. Half of the defendants were cleared of all charges and released by Germany.

The case of the Chełmno death camp

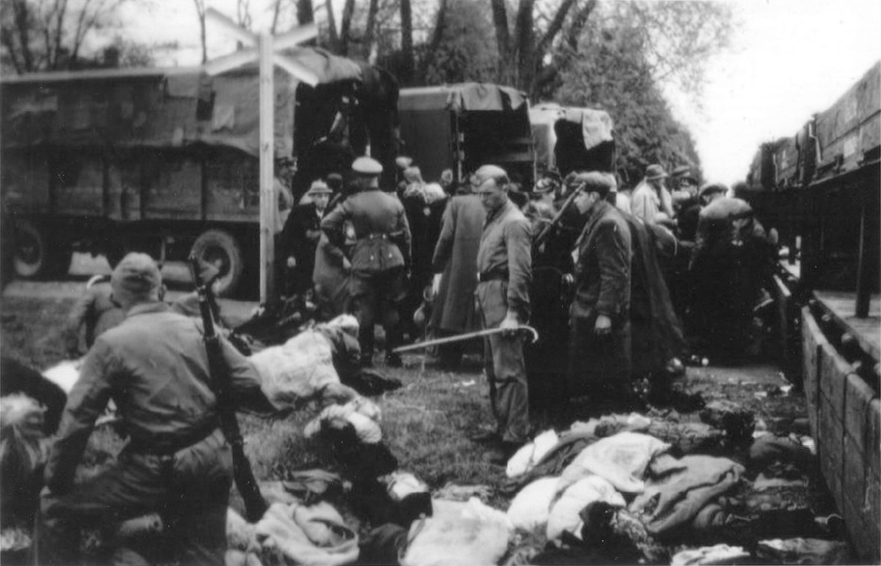
Deportation to Chełmno.

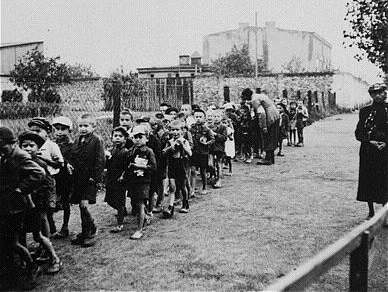
Ghetto children rounded up for deportation to Chełmno

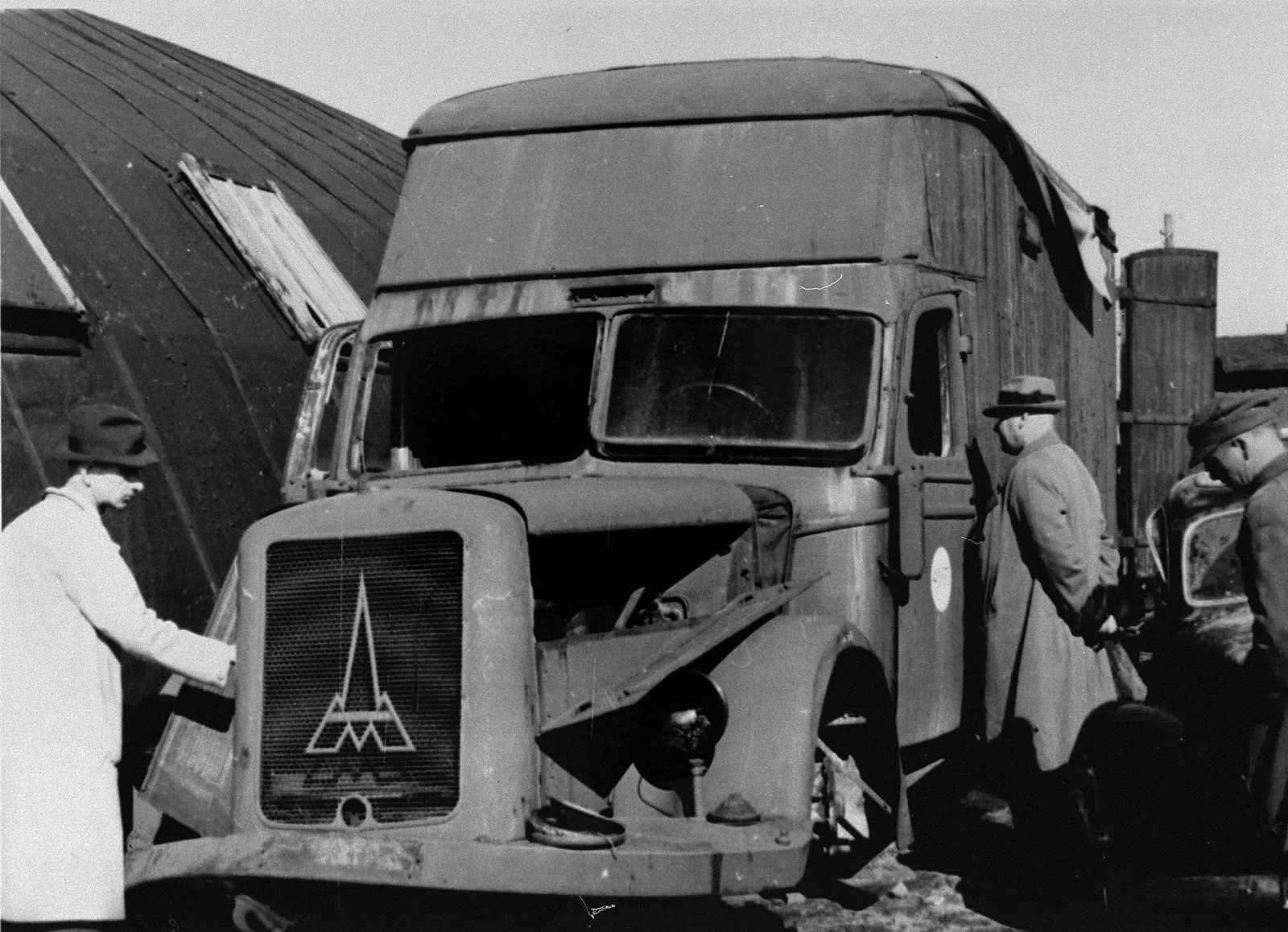
A damaged Magirus-Deutz van, similar to those used as gas vans at Chełmno extermination camp

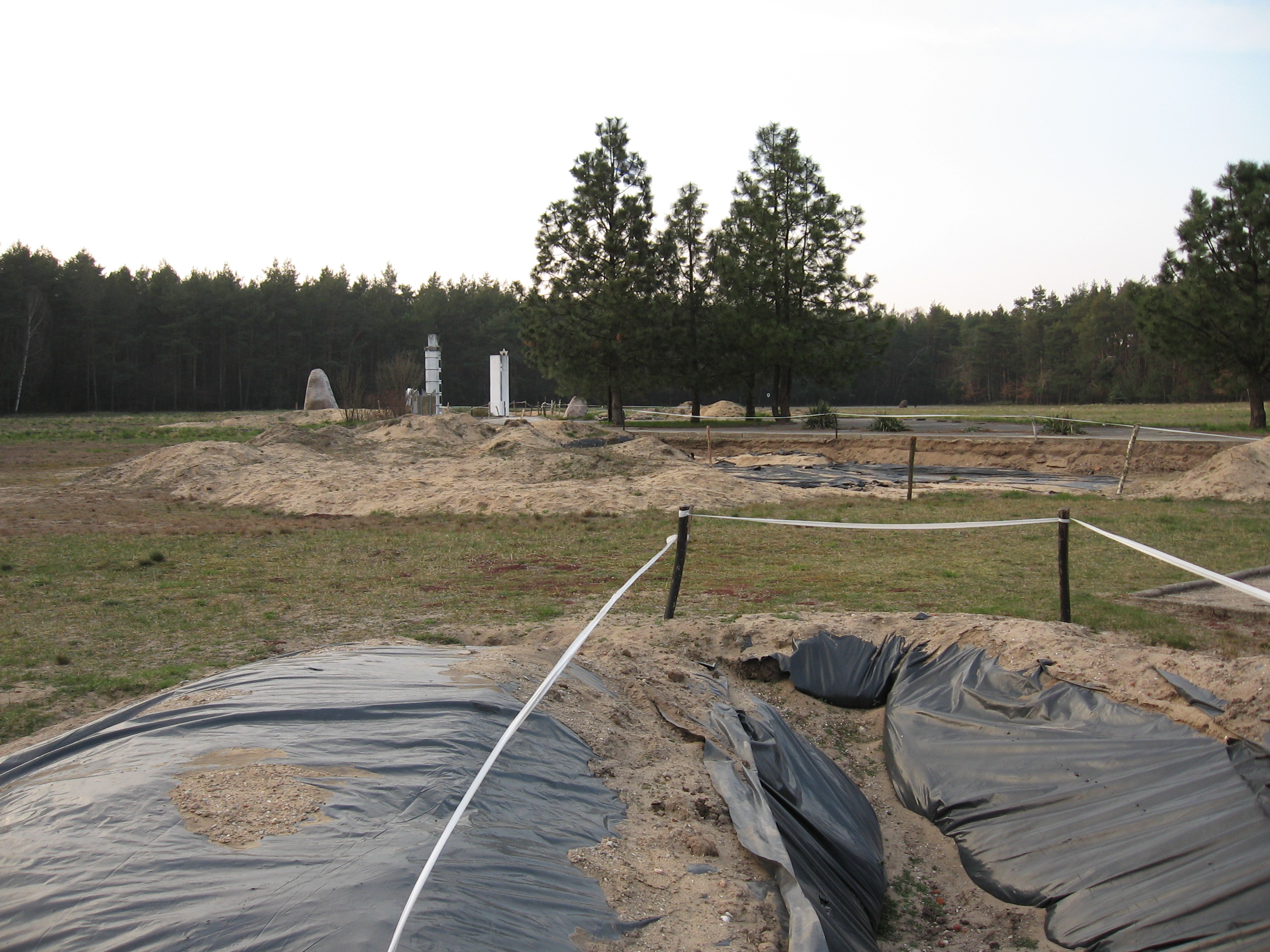
Archeological excavations at the forest Waldlager camp where the corpses were cremated on rails, ashes cooled and shovelled into sacks to be trucked to the nearby river at night

== 1945 Chełmno Trial in Poland ==
After liberation by the Soviet Army, the new government of Poland began its official investigation into the Chełmno war crimes on May 24, 1945. Although most Germans fled, Piller and Gielow were soon captured by the Soviets and brought back.

Notably, the trial of Holocaust perpetrators from Chełmno was unlike any other war-crimes trial, because the camp had been essentially eradicated by the SS, along with most traces of the mass murder. Truckloads of ashes of its victims were dumped in the Warta river daily, the "palace" was blown up with rubble removed to foundations, mobile gas-chambers and loot were driven back to Berlin, written records were destroyed, including train departure records. There was nothing to see for the commissars, or draw interest. Some of the key evidence was mistakenly discarded in the trash in 1945 (i.e. over 5,000 pairs of damaged shoes from a destroyed synagogue in Koło), or hauled away as usable materials, including wooden fencing and cremation grids; few people were aware of its importance. By comparison, other former death camps were overflowing with direct evidence of war-crimes, as in the case of the Majdanek trial decided several months before.

Judge Bednarz soon ordered excavation of the waste in a Schlosslager burn pit. About 24,200 spoons, 4,500 knives, and 2,500 forks were found, among pots, pans, eyeglasses and many other half-burned items in the debris. It was also known that most of the victims were Jews from the Łódź Ghetto, where chronicles of ghetto operations were found; in addition, non-Jewish Poles, Soviet prisoners, about 5,000 Gypsies, and whole transports of children had been deported to Chełmno where they were murdered. The SS Master Sergeant Walter Piller testified about the final phase of the camp operation, including 1944 deportations from Łódź. To circumvent the Nazi destruction of records and evidence, Judge Bednarz used Łódź ghetto records and estimates to arrive at the number of victims. Based on ghetto statistics together with testimonies, he estimated some 350,000 victims. He did not account for the period of camp inactivity. The range of estimated victims presented at the 1962 trial in Bonn was 180,000 with 152,000 as the lowest acceptable number.

The first Chełmno trial in Poland established many critical details from the camp history, but also revealed the operation of mobile gas chambers, which used exhaust fumes as the killing agent, diverted into sheet metal-lined vans. The names of SS officials and commanders at the camp were established, including the SS-Hauptsturmführer Herbert Lange and the SS-Hauptsturmführer Hans Bothmann who had vanished. Both men were later found to have committed suicide.

=== Survivor testimonies ===
Judge Władysław Bednarz, assisted by the Deputy Recording Clerk, heard testimonies of key witnesses including Szymon (Simon) Srebrnik (age fifteen), who survived being shot in the head during the Germans' last execution of Jews at the camp, and Michał (Mordechaï) Podchlebnik, who escaped in 1942 into the surrounding forest from the burial Sonderkommando. Podchlebnik testified on June 9, 1945. He was at the camp for 10 days digging mass graves in January 1942 at the time of the Nazi Aktion Reinhard. The cremation process was implemented there a year later.

I figured that about 1,000 people were gassed every day... which filled three to four metres of trench... I had been trying to persuade my inmates to escape... On the way to work, I noticed that one of the windows on the bus could be lowered. I told my companion Winer from Izbica... we were separated and I had to get into the truck... I cut the tarpaulin... and jumped out of the car. They started shooting at me but all bullets missed the target. Luckily the bus did not follow the truck... After two days, during which I did not eat anything... [I] headed in the direction of Grabów town. On my way I stopped at some peasant’s cottages (I do not know his name). He gave me some food and a hat, shaved me and showed the way. In Grabów I met Winer...

— From Michał Podchlebnik, Chelmno Survivor Testimony.

The second survivor from the Jewish Sonderkommando, Szymon Srebrnik, was from Łódź and 15 years old at the end of the war. He testified on June 29, 1945 in Koło; he was not under oath, although informed of criminal liability for a false statement. Srebnik worked at the forest camp during the second extermination phase, when the bodies were cremated after being delivered in the gas-vans.

In March 1944... we were in the Sonderkommando camp... The stronger and better workers were sent to the woods... The Waldkommando consisted of about 40 Jews... We were all shackled... The furnaces were very primitive, they stood on a cement foundation... They were approximately three metres (10 feet) tall. The width was about the same. The fire grate was made of narrow-gauge railroad railings... The capacity of one furnace was more or less the same as one van... It took approximately one hour for the corpses to burn. Then a new pile of bodies were added... While the clothes were being sorted, high ranking SS-men came and chose something for themselves...

— From Szymon Srebrnik, Chelmno Survivor Testimony.

=== The defendants ===
On October 29/30, 1945, Judge Władysław Bednarz questioned German Oberwachtmeister Bruno Israel (born Bruno Koenig), employed at the final phase of the Chełmno extermination. He was accused of committing crimes against the Polish nation under the PKWN Decree of August 31, 1944 pertaining to Nazi War Criminals (the so-called Sierpniówka. This provided for the death penalty without direct appeal). The defendant claimed to be not guilty.

Bruno Israel testified the following:

In July or August 1944... I was assigned to the Sonderkommando Kulmhof... I took part in the escorting of the transports. When Jews asked where they were being taken, I answered... they were going to work. The Jews generally believed it and behaved peacefully... They were given soap, unless they had their own. They were told they would get towels at the bath-house. Then all of them, both men and women were herded into a corral at the exit of which there was a Sonderwagen (the van)... The [dead] bodies were thrown into one of the [Waldlager] crematoriums. The furnaces were about 10 meters wide and about 5-6 meters long. They did not stick out above the ground level. They had no chimneys.

— Oberwachtmeister Bruno Israel, Chelmno Defendant Testimony.

Although Bruno Israel was convicted of war crimes and sentenced to death, the Polish President Bolesław Bierut granted him clemency in September 1946, commuting his sentence to life. Israel was released conditionally for five years in November 1958, and was never required to return to prison.

Statutory death sentences were given to other two defendants, who were found guilty. Both Walter Piller and Hermann Gielow applied for a presidential pardon, which they were not granted. After a few years spent on death row, Walter Piller was executed on January 19, 1949. Herman Gielow was executed in the Poznań Prison on June 6, 1951. The very Decree of August 31, 1944 used in their sentencing was amended in December 1946, making the laws not applicable from the outset, in connection with the Soviet World War II crimes in Poland.

== Chełmno Trials in Germany 1962–1965 ==
Eleven indicted suspects from Chełmno were arraigned at the Special Criminal Court in Bonn, RFN (Landgericht Bonn) in 1962–1965 on charges of complicity to the murder of 180,000 Jews. A total of four trials were held. Later observers referred to at least one of them as a judicial farce. Genocide was not in the criminal code of Nazi Germany and the court ruled that it could not be applied retroactively. Depositions were not sufficient to secure convictions. There was little physical evidence remaining at the crime scene. No victims' bodies to examine: their ashes had been carried downriver and out to sea.

The most severe penalties of 15 years were given to Gustav Laabs, SS Hauptscharführer, a gas van operator, and Alois Häfele, SS Untersturmführer, a camp Hauskommando leader. The latter's sentence was reduced by two years on appeal because he reportedly gave cigarettes to some of the walking dead. Half of the defendants were cleared of all charges and released. Oberscharführer Gustaw Fiedler, from Polizeiwachtkommando, was tried in 1965 in Cologne and sentenced to 13½ months imprisonment.

#	Defendant	Born	Rank	Function	Sentence
1	Gustav Laabs	20 December 1902	SS Hauptscharführer	Gas-van operator	15 years imprisonment
2	Walter Burmeister	2 May 1906	SS Unterscharführer	Bothmann adjutant	13 years imprisonment
3	Alois Häfele	5 July 1893	SS Untersturmführer	SS Camp Hauskommando leader	15 years imprisonment
4	Kurt Möbius	3 May 1895	SS Scharführer	SS Camp guard	8 years imprisonment
5	Karl Heinl	11 April 1912	SS Unterscharführer	SS Camp guard	7 years imprisonment
6	Walter (Ernst) Burmeister	(ntbcw)	Gaswagenfahrer	Gas-van operator	3 ½ years imprisonment
7	Heinrich Bock	16 June 1912	SS Scharführer	SS Camp guard	acquitted and released
8	Anton Mehring	25 March 1920	Unterscharführer	SS personnel	acquitted and released
9	Aleksander Steinke	16 March 1912	Polizei-Oberwachmeister	SS personnel	acquitted and released
10	Friedrich Maderholz	7 November 1919	Hauptscharführer	SS Camp guard	acquitted and released
11	Wilhelm Heukelbach	28 February 1911	SS Oberscharführer	SS personnel	acquitted and released
12	Wilhelm Schulte	23 June 1912	Hauptscharführer	SS personnel	acquitted and released
13	Gustaw Fiedler	(1965 trial)	Oberscharführer	Polizeiwachtkommando	13 months 2 weeks imprisonment

The first camp commandant, SS Sturmbannführer Herbert Lange, was killed in action on April 20, 1945, near Berlin. The second head of Chełmno, Hauptsturmführer Hans Bothmann who made substantial improvements to the killing method in the final phase of the camp operation, committed suicide in British custody in April 1946.

== Poland 2001 ==
The last person charged in connection with the crimes at Chełmno was a Pole, Henryk Mania. He was one of eight Polish prisoners who worked with the camp Sonderkommando. Mania had been originally imprisoned after being accused of attempting to poison a German. These eight prisoners has previously worked as sonderkommando at Fort VII prison where they would dispose of dead prisoners. The men were then transferred to Chełmno after being selected by Herbert Lange Fifty-six years after the end of World War II, he was convicted as an accessory to murder.

His investigation, begun in 1956, was renewed in 1991 by the Institute of National Remembrance. He was tried in a 2001 court case in Poznań. The collapse of several communist regimes and release of new records made it possible. Mania was found guilty of helping to load prisoners into gas-vans and collecting their watches and jewellery, which he also stole for himself. He was sentenced to eight years' imprisonment, with consideration given to his advanced age.

== See also ==
- Auschwitz trial held in Kraków, Poland in 1947 against 40 SS-staff of the Auschwitz concentration camp death factory
- Belsen trial
- Belzec trial before the 1st Munich District Court in the mid-1960s of the eight SS-men of the Belzec extermination camp command
- Dachau trials, held within the walls of the former Dachau concentration camp, 1945–1948
- Frankfurt Auschwitz trials
- Majdanek trials, the longest Nazi war crimes trial in history, spanning over 30 years
- Mauthausen-Gusen camp trials
- Ravensbrück trial
- Sobibor trial, held in Hagen, Germany in 1965, concerning the Sobibor extermination camp officials
- Treblinka trials in Düsseldorf, Germany
