= The World Will Tremble =

2025 American historical drama film

- Theatrical release poster
- Directed by: Lior Geller
- Written by: Lior Geller
- Produced by: Phillip J. Roth; Arthur Landon; Lior Geller; Sufo Evtimov; Saar Yogev; Naomi Levari
- Starring: Oliver Jackson-Cohen; Jeremy Neumark Jones; Charlie MacGechan; Michael Epp; David Kross; Michael Fox; Anton Lesser
- Cinematography: Ivan Vatsov
- Edited by: Tal Keller; Lior Geller
- Music by: Erez Koskas
- Production companies: Black Sheep Films; Radiancy Pictures; Lorton Entertainment; UFO Films
- Distributed by: Vertical
- Release dates: January 16, 2025 (Miami Jewish Film Festival); March 14, 2025 (United States)
- Running time: 109 minutes
- Countries: United States; United Kingdom; Bulgaria; Israel
- Language: English

The World Will Tremble is a 2025 historical drama film written and directed by Lior Geller, and starring Oliver Jackson-Cohen and Jeremy Neumark Jones. It tells the true story of the attempt by Michael Podchlebnik and Szlama Ber Winer to escape the Chełmno extermination camp in order to provide the first eyewitness account of the Third Reich's mass murder of Jews during World War II.

== Plot ==
Polish Jews and Sonderkommando workers Solomon Wiener and Michael Podchlebnik plot an escape from their Nazi captors in Occupied Poland. After being forced to dig a mass grave in the Polish wilderness, Solomon, Michael, and another Jewish inmate, Wolf Kaminski, are marched to the Chełmno extermination camp run by the Kommandant, Sturmbannführer Herbert Lange. He tells the newcomers of false promises about working in Leipzig. Solomon, Michael, and Wolf are forced to gather the belongings and clothes of fellow Jewish arrivals who are stripped and forced into a gas van, where most are asphyxiated. The truck is brought back to the mass grave the men originally dug where the bodies are dragged out and dumped, watching as Lenz, the camp's Polizeimeister, shoots any survivors. During this, Michael discovers his wife, Klara, was among the victims in the truck. Michael begs Lenz to kill him, but Lenz refuses and forces the inmates to spread quicklime onto the bodies.

On their way back to the camp, the transport trucks carrying the Sonderkommandos breaks down, and they are forced to march back to Chełmno. During their journey back, they witness Nazi sympathizers bring a Jewish escapee to Lenz. Lenz proceeds to kill the escapee and to pay the men off. After returning to Chełmno, Solomon, Michael, Wolf, and some of their fellow prisoners begin plotting their escape from the camp. They are then lined up in front of Lange to conduct an exercise, during which, a fellow Jew, Monik, drops a knife. As punishment, Lenz slits Monik's throat, but not before Monik spits at Lange. To further humiliate them, Lange forces the prisoners to dance along with a female prisoner, while the camp guards fire shots towards their feet, accidentally killing the woman, much to Lange's dismay. The prisoners are then forced to stand in line and hold glass bottles over their heads for the Nazis to have target practice. Wolf is shot in the neck and bleeds to death, but not before slipping a smuggled pencil to Solomon and urging him to get to Grabów. After being taken back to their bunks, Solomon urges Michael to escape and to spread the word about the Nazi crimes. Solomon asks the other inmates to have faith and to help him write a list of names and home towns of their fellow Jews who were murdered by the Nazis.

A transport truck arrives and Lenz orders the prisoners onto the truck. Two fellow prisoners, Goldman and Felix, distract Lenz and his men long enough for Solomon and Michael to cut through the truck's canopy and flee through the nearby forest. Lenz and his soldiers chase after them while firing in their direction. The two inmates shake off their pursuers by swimming across a river, but Michael discovers that he has been shot in the leg. While going through the forest, the duo stumble upon a farm where the lady of the house provides them with railway uniforms, and they manage to steal a Nazi officer's motorcycle. While traveling, they come across a Wehrmacht platoon and are forced to help them get a transport truck out of the mud, fooling them with the disguises. Afterwards, the platoon's field medic treats Michael's leg.

Solomon and Michael finally reach the Grabów ghetto while evading the police and the Judenrat during curfew, where they meet Rabbi Schulman and warn him about the death camps. Schulman is hesitant to believe Solomon but comes to terms with his warning. Schulman begins writing down Solomon's witness testimony. As Solomon tells the Rabbi of his experience, he breaks into tears and Schulman promises him that the message will spread out, saying that the world will tremble when it hears of this news.

=== Epilogue ===
The Epilogue states that Solomon's testimony was the first eyewitness account of the Nazi's mass murder of Jews. On June 26, 1942, the message was broadcast from BBC Radio in London after the Jewish Underground smuggled it there, marking it as the first news report on the Holocaust. The Nazis upgraded from gas vans to gas chambers which were utilized in Auschwitz and Treblinka. Out of 220,000 Jews sent to Chełmno, only four survived. Rabbi Schulman never abandoned his community and 3 weeks after meeting with Solomon and Michael, he was taken to Chełmno along with his fellow Jews and immediately gassed. In April 1942, Solomon Wiener, while searching for any surviving family members, was captured and taken to Belzec where he was gassed, but not before sending out one last message about the gassings there. Michael Podchlebnik parted with Solomon after Grabów, taking refuge in a Polish farm till the end of the war. After the war, he immigrated to Israel where he remarried and had two sons. In 1962, he was a witness at the trials of Chełmno's guards in West Germany. A video of Michael's testimony from 1979 was released where he gave an account on his experience discovering his wife and children in a mass grave.

== Premise ==
A group of prisoners attempt to escape Chełmno extermination camp, during World War II, the first known Nazi camp of that nature, with the plan to tell the world of the systematic atrocities carried out.

== Cast ==
- Oliver Jackson-Cohen as Solomon Wiener, a Polish Jew from Izbica working in the Chełmno Sonderkommando who plotted an escape from his Nazi Captors
- Jeremy Neumark Jones as Michael Podchlebnik, a Polish Jew from Kolo working in the Chełmno Sonderkommando who plotted an escape from his Nazi Captors after losing his family
- Charlie MacGechan as Wolf Kaminski, a Polish Jew in the Chełmno Sonderkommando and one of the plotters of the escape
- Michael Epp as Lenz, a sadistic Nazi Polizeimeister at Chełmno
- David Kross as Sturmbannführer Herbert Lange, the Kommandant of Chełmno
- Michael Fox as Monik, a Polish Jew in the Chełmno Sonderkommando and one of the plotters of the escape
- Danny Scheinmann as Goldman, the eldest Polish Jew in the Chełmno Sonderkommando
- Adi Kvetner as Felix, a Polish Jew in the Chełmno Sonderkommando
- Anton Lesser as Rabbi Schulman, the Rabbi of Grabów
- Tim Bergmann as Burmeister
- Oliver Möller as Mobius
- George Lenz as Gustav
- Leonard Proxauf as Oskar, a Nazi transport officer for Chełmno
- Gilles Ben David as Aaron, an elder Rabbi brought to Chełmno, whom Solomon knew
- Ulrich Brandhoff as Wehrmacht Officer Stangl, the Commanding officer of a Wehrmacht platoon whom Solomon and Michael stumbled across
- Uri Roodner as Abramson, an elderly Jew of the Grabów Ghetto
- Gergana Pletnyova as a Polish woman

== Production ==
=== Development ===
Writer and director Lior Geller spent ten years researching the Chełmno extermination camp and was assisted by historian Dr. Na’ama Shik from Jerusalem’s Yad Vashem Holocaust memorial centre. The film is produced by Lorton Entertainment, UFO Films, Black Sheep Films, and Radiancy Pictures. Ben Silverman of Propagate Content, Arthur Landon and Ed Barratt of Lorton Entertainment, Phillip J. Roth of UFO, Yair Ilan of Radiancy Pictures, Erez Koskas of Cedar House Studio and Saar Yogev and Naomi Levari of Black Sheep Films are producers.

=== Casting ===
The cast is led by Oliver Jackson-Cohen and Jeremy Neumark Jones and also includes Charlie MacGechan, Anton Lesser, David Kross, Michael Fox, Michael Epp, Danny Scheinmann, Tim Bergmann and George Lenz.

== Release ==
The film had its world premiere at the Miami Jewish Film Festival in Miami, Florida on January 16, 2025. It was released in the United States by Vertical on March 14, 2025.

Since the film's US theatrical release it has become an international streaming sensation, reaching the global Netflix top ten and securing the number one spot in multiple countries.

== Reception ==
On the review aggregator website Rotten Tomatoes, 93% of 14 critics' reviews are positive, with an average rating of 7.6/10.

Film critic Keith Garlington said of the film, "Deftly handled with accuracy and urgency, Geller's film is both a powerful testimony and a harrowing indictment that doesn't gaze directly upon the horror but it doesn't hide from it either. The results are astonishing... With The World Will Tremble, Lior Geller joins the talented chorus of cinematic voices who responsibly ensure the Holocaust is remembered for the evil that it was and for the generational pain it has inflicted." Film critic Codie Allen called the film "raw, immediate, and deeply human", while movie critic Joshua Hayes called the film, "Deeply compelling… The World Will Tremble is one of the most accurate onscreen portrayals of the Holocaust to date".

Holocaust historian Dr. Na'ama Shik of Yad Vashem said of the film, "Destined to become one of the most important, watched and studied films of the Holocaust."
