= Gustav Laabs =

German SS officer

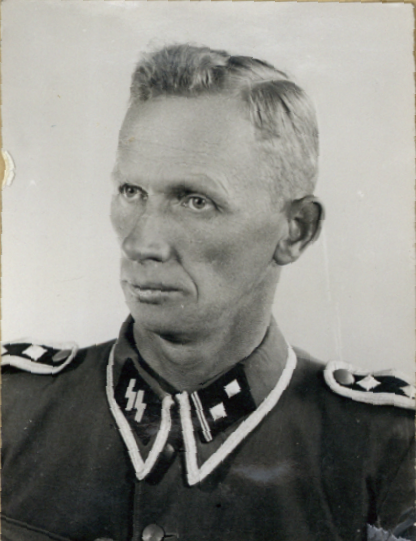
- Born: 20 December 1902; German Empire
- Died: 12 March 1980 (aged 77)
- Military career
- Allegiance: Nazi Germany
- Branch: SS
- Service years: Unknown–1945
- Rank: SS-Hauptscharführer
- Conflicts: Second World War

Gustav Laabs (20 December 1902 – 12 March 1980) was a German SS NCO during the Nazi era. During the Second World War, he worked as a gas van operator at the Chełmno extermination camp in Wartheland. As an operator of a gas van, Laabs was directly involved in the genocidal extermination of over 100,000 men, women and children, most of whom were Jewish. In November 1963, he was tried and convicted for crimes against humanity, and sentenced to 15 years (subsequently reduced to 13 years) by a regional court in Landgericht Bonn, Germany.

== Early life ==
Laabs was born in Germany on 20 December 1902, little else is known of Laabs' life prior to the beginning of his military career.

== SS ==
=== Chełmno concentration camp ===
Laabs was ordered to the Chełmno concentration camp where he served between April 1942 and January 1945, and started driving the gas wagon within a few days of his arrival. He had earlier worked at the vehicle pool at the Reichssicherheitshauptamt (Reich Security Main Office; RSHA) and had been transferred to a Sonderkommando in Posen (Poznań in Polish); he had to agree to remain silent about his work there.

When Laabs went to the Gestapo headquarters in Posen, he was informed that he would start working at a Sonderkommando in Chełmno. The next day, he met Walter Burmeister, who drove him and another SS-man, Oskar Hering, to Chełmno. The camp, located in Chełmno nad Nerem, consisted of an old manor building and an area of about 3–4 kilometres of woods to the northwest of the manor building. The next day, SS-man Erwin Bürstinger, who was responsible for the vehicles, showed Laabs and Hering the camp and told them to test drive the gas wagons.

In later court hearings, Laabs spoke about how the gassings were done. He drove the gas wagon alongside the manor building and about fifty Jews were brought into the wagon at a time. When it was full, the back door was locked. A hose was connected between the gas wagon's exhaust and an opening in the wagon. Laabs was then told to start the engine and let it run; it took about 30 minutes until all the victims were dead. Laabs was then ordered to drive to a wooded area in the village of Koło to unload the bodies. A police officer went with Laabs, at first, to show him where to unload them: in a mass grave about three kilometres into the wood. Anyone who had survived the gassing was shot.

=== Destruction of evidence of mass murder ===
In early 1942, Standartenführer Paul Blobel was ordered by Reinhard Heydrich to lead the Sonderaktion 1005, which was tasked with digging up the mass graves to burn the corpses. Heydrich was murdered a few months later and the plans were halted. The following year Reichsführer-SS Heinrich Himmler gave orders that all mass graves in Poland and the Soviet Union be demolished, leaving no traces of the mass murder. Blobel's work started in Chełmno, where they tried to destroy the exhumed bodies in fire bombings, this method proved ineffective and Blobel decided to burn the bodies on iron bars in a large fire. Laabs told a later court hearing that the camp managers ordered a machine to grind down the bones following the burning. The ashes of the bodies were poured into the Ner river. The area of the mass graves was destroyed and new trees were planted.

== Chełmno trials and criminal conviction ==
At the end of November 1963, Laabs and ten other people from the Chełmno concentration camp were tried at the Landgericht Bonn regional court. Laabs was indicted for the murder of 100,000 people in the gas van and for personally shooting the few survivors. On 30 March 1964, Laabs was sentenced to 15 years imprisonment and lost 10 years of citizenship rights for his part in the Holocaust. His sentence was later reduced to 13 years imprisonment.

== Representation in media ==
In 1979, Claude Lanzmann attempted to interview Laabs for the documentary film Shoah.

He was played by George Lenz in the 2025 film The World Will Tremble.
