= Laabs =

Laabs is a surname. Notable people with the surname include:

- August W. Laabs (1873–1941), American farmer, businessman and politician
- Chet Laabs (1912–1983), American baseball player
- Gustav Laabs (1902-1980), German war criminal
- Herbert Laabs (born 1950), East German sprint canoeist
