= Operation Tannenberg =

Anti-Polish extermination actions by Nazi Germany

Operation Tannenberg Unternehmen Tannenberg
- Part of Generalplan Ost
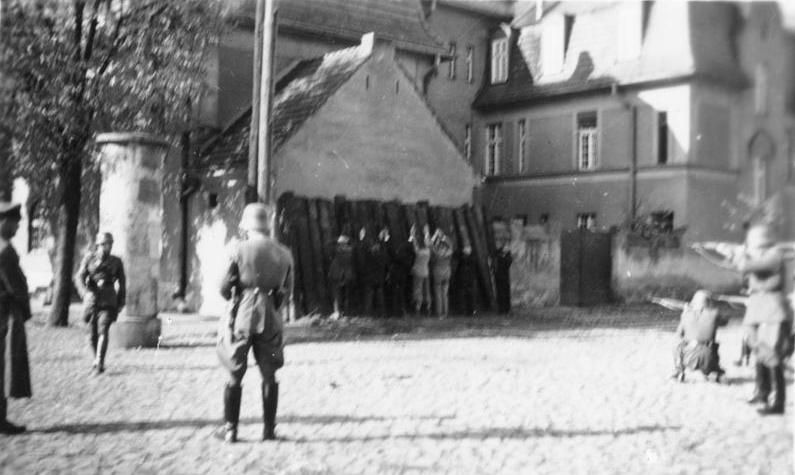
- The mass murder of Polish townsmen in Reichsgau Wartheland (western Poland) during Operation Tannenberg on 20 October 1939.
- Location: German-occupied Poland
- Date: September 1939 – January 1940
- Target: Poles
- Attack type: Mass shooting, summary execution, genocidal massacres
- Weapons: Firearms; Gas vans
- Deaths: 20,000 deaths (during 1–2 months) in 760 mass executions by SS Einsatzgruppen
- Perpetrators: Nazi Germany, specifically the Einsatzgruppen
- Motive: Anti-Polish sentiment, Nazi racism, destruction of the Polish Intelligentsia

Operation Tannenberg (German: Unternehmen Tannenberg, Polish: Operacja Tannenberg) was one of the first anti-Polish extermination actions by Nazi Germany in German-occupied Poland from September 1939 to January 1940. The operation was conducted with the use of the Sonderfahndungsbuch Polen, a proscription list of more than 61,000 members of the Second Polish Republic's elite who were to be arrested then interned or shot.

Around 20,000 Poles were arrested and killed by the Einsatzgruppen in a number of mass killings during Operation Tannenberg, which was followed by the shooting and gassing of hospital patients and disabled adults as part of the wider Aktion T4 programme. (Note: The second phase of Operation Tannenberg referred to as the Unternehmen Tannenberg by Heydrich's Sonderreferat began in late 1939 under the codename Intelligenzaktion and lasted until January 1940, in which 36,000–42,000 people, including Polish children, were killed in Pomerania before the end of 1939.)

== Implementation ==
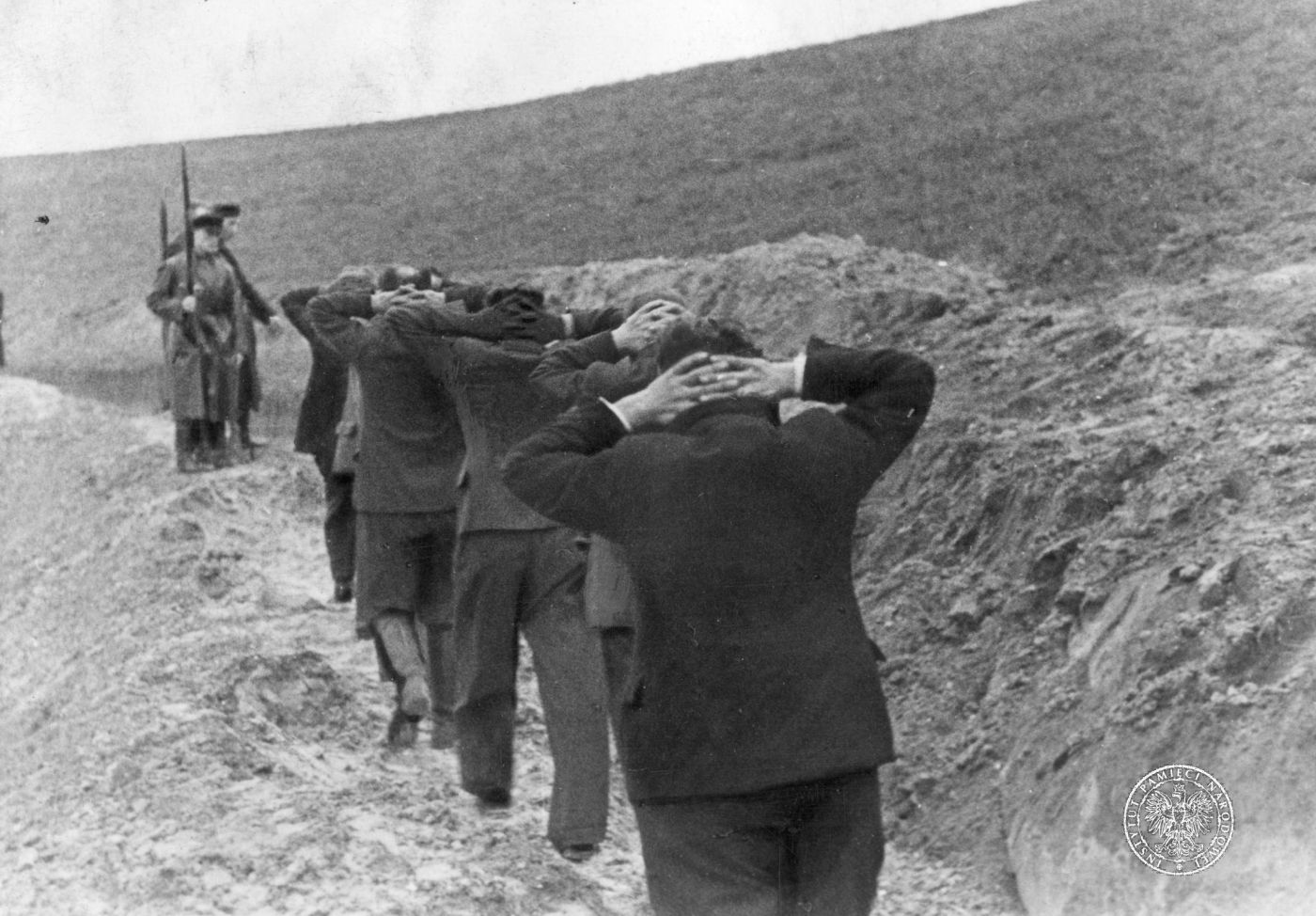
Polish teachers from Bydgoszcz guarded by members of Volksdeutscher Selbstschutz before execution

Between 1937 and 1939, Nazi Germany produced the Sonderfahndungsbuch Polen (Special Prosecution Book – Poland), a list of individuals in the Second Polish Republic who were seen as a potential threat to future German conquest and rule. These included 61,000 prominent activists, intelligentsia, scholars, clergy, actors, former officers and others of cultural or political importance. The list was compiled by the Gestapo, the secret police agency under the Reich Security Main Office, with the assistance of members of the German minority in Poland.

Following the orders of Adolf Hitler, a special unit dubbed Tannenberg was created within the Reich Security Main Office, commanding five Einsatzgruppen units of 27,000 men formed with Gestapo, Kripo and Sicherheitsdienst (SD) officers. These men were theoretically to follow the Wehrmacht into occupied territories, and their task was to track down and arrest all the people listed on the proscription lists exactly as it had been compiled before the outbreak of war. The plan was finalized in May 1939 by the Central Office II P (Poland).

The first phase of the action occurred in September 1939, and was perpetrated by the Einsatzgruppen, with assistance from the local Volksdeutscher Selbstschutz and Sturmabteilung militias. Around 20,000 people on the list were caught and subsequently killed in 760 mass killings over a 4-month period, some which included pregnant women.

=== Massacres of hospital patients ===
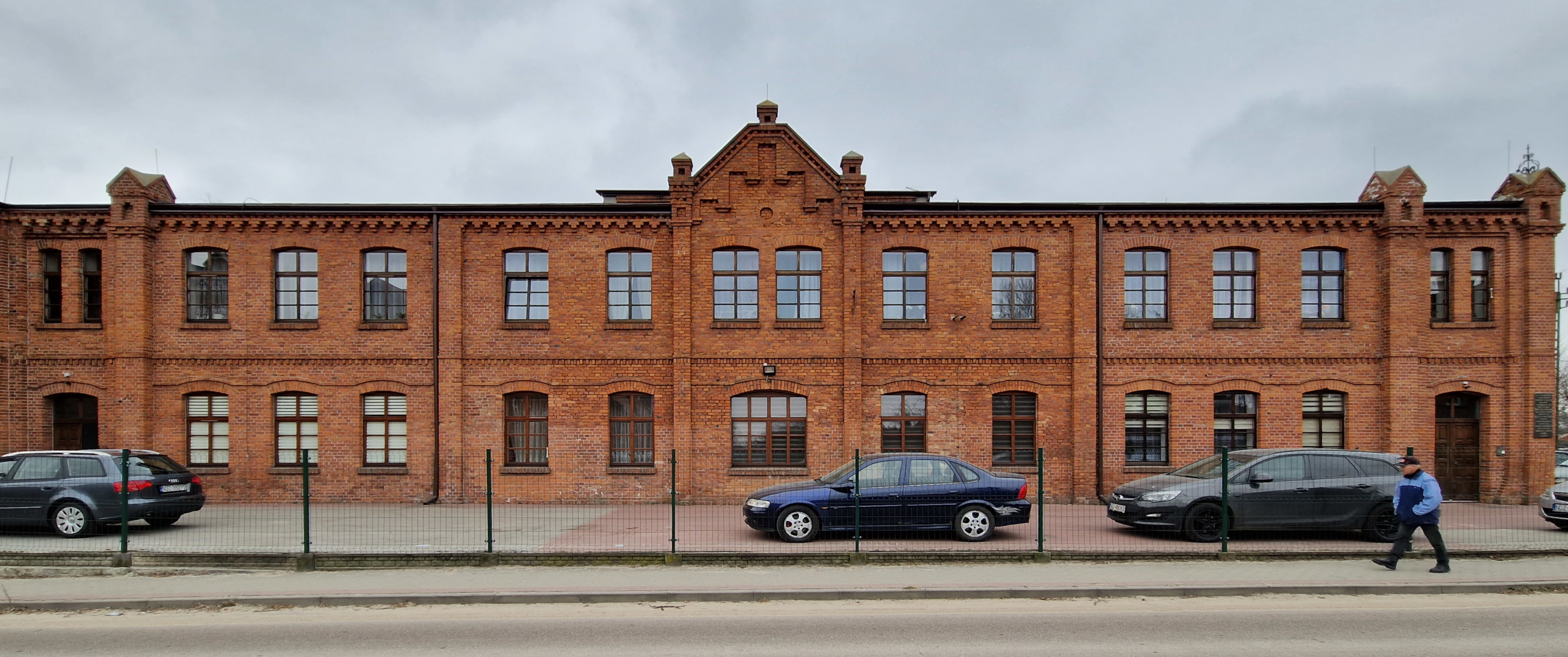
Remaining building of former SS at Soldau concentration camp in Iłowo-Osada, location of first gas van experiments by SS-Sonderkommando Lange using Polish hospital patients

After the extermination of the Polish elite, patients from Polish hospitals were murdered in Wartheland (Wielkopolska) by Einsatzgruppe VI men. They were led by Herbert Lange, who was under the command of Erich Naumann. He was appointed commandant of the first Chełmno extermination camp soon thereafter. By mid-1940, Lange and his men were responsible for the murder of about 1,100 patients in Owińska, 2,750 patients at Kościan, 1,558 patients and 300 Poles at Działdowo who were shot in the back of the neck; and hundreds of Poles at Fort VII where the mobile gas-chamber (Einsatzwagen) was first developed along with the first gassing bunker.

According to the historian Peter Longerich, the hospital massacres were conducted on the initiative of Einsatzgruppen, because they were not ordered by SS chief Heinrich Himmler. Lange's experience in the mass killing of Poles during Operation Tannenberg was the reason why Ernst Damzog, the Commander of Sicherheitspolizei (Security Police) and SD stationed in occupied Poznań (Posen) placed him in charge of the SS-Sonderkommando Lange (special detachment) for the purpose of mass gassing operations which led to the eventual annihilation of the Łódź Ghetto.

== See also ==
- Anti-Polonism – Hostility, prejudice, or discrimination against Poland or people of Polish ethnicity
- Genocide – Intentional destruction of a people
- German crimes during the September Campaign – German war crimes
- Gestapo–NKVD conferences (1939–1940) – Police meetings organized by Germany and the Soviet Union
- History of Poland (1939–1945)
- Intelligenzaktion – Plan of extermination of Polish intelligentsia by German troops in 1939
- Intelligenzaktion Pommern – 1939–1940 massacres in Pomerania committed by Nazi Germany
- Katyn massacre – Soviet massacre of Polish military officers and intelligentsia in 1940
- Nazi crimes against the Polish nation
- Operation Himmler – 1939 false-flag operations by Germany against Poland
- Pacification operations in German-occupied Poland
- Special Prosecution Book-Poland – 1937–1939 arrest list of Polish people prepared by Nazi Germany
- Valley of Death – Mass murder of Polish civilians, 1939
- Wawelberg Group – Polish special-forces unit

== Bibliography ==
- Verbatim transcript of Part I of the book The German New Order in Poland published for the Polish Ministry of Information by Hutchinson & Co., London, in late 1941. The period covered by the book is September, 1939 to June, 1941.
