= Hans Bothmann =

SS officer (1911–1946)

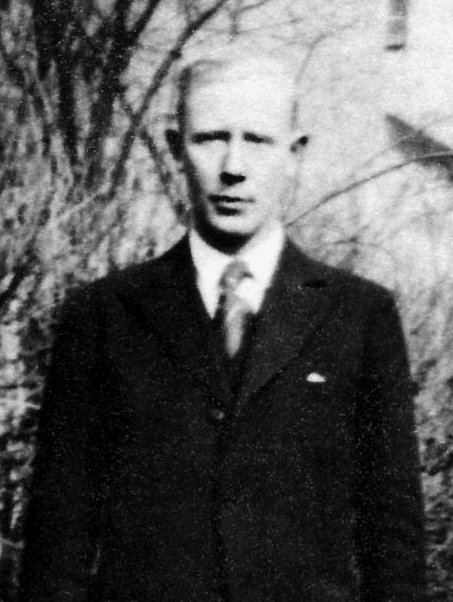
- Photograph of Bothmann in civilian clothing
- Born: November 11, 1911; Dithmarschen, German Empire
- Died: April 4, 1946 (aged 34); Heide, Allied-occupied Germany
- Cause of death: Suicide by hanging
- Military career
- Allegiance: Nazi Germany
- Branch: Schutzstaffel
- Rank: SS-Hauptsturmführer
- Unit: SS-Totenkopfverbände

Hans Bothmann or Hans Johann Bothmann (November 11, 1911 – April 4, 1946) was the last commandant of the Chełmno extermination camp from 1942 on (SS card number 117630); leader of the SS Special Detachment Bothmann conducting the extermination of Jews from the Łódź Ghetto and other places. He committed suicide in British custody in April 1946 while in Heide.

== Career ==
Bothmann was born in Lohe-Rickelshof village in the Dithmarschen district of Holstein (northern Germany) in November 1911. He joined the paramilitary Hitler Youth (Hitlerjugend, HJ) in 1932. Soon, he got a full-time job with the Gestapo office Stapoleitstelle Berlin, and in 1937 became a Kriminalkommissar there. He was 27 years old at the time of the German invasion of Poland.

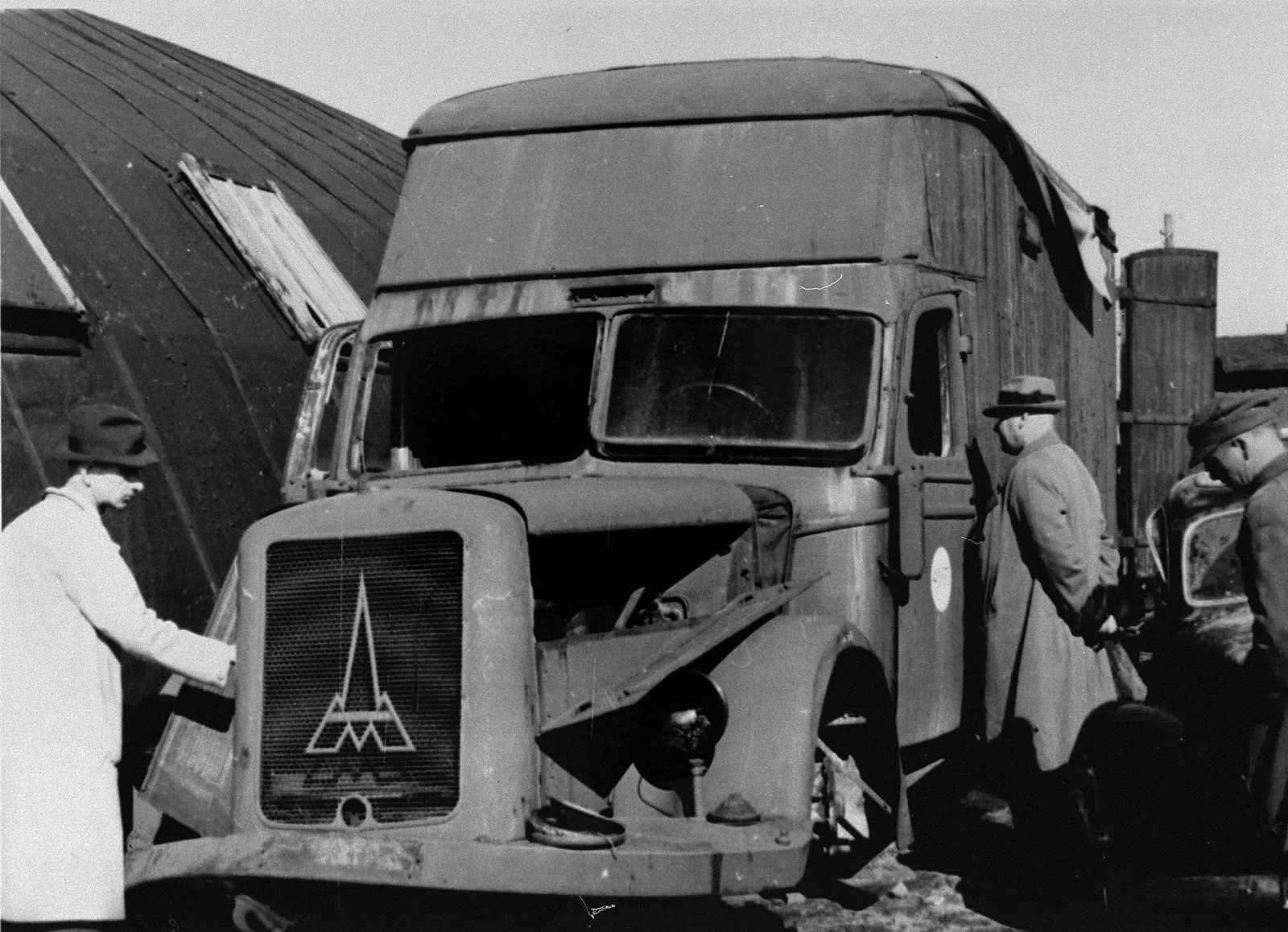
A model of Magirus-Deutz gas van used for suffocation at the Chełmno extermination camp. This particular van has not been modified.

During the summer of 1942, after replacing Hauptsturmführer Herbert Lange at Chełmno, Hans Bothmann made substantial changes to the camp's killing methods. These alterations were prompted by two incidents in March and April of that year. First, one of the gas vans broke down on the highway while conveying living victims, and exploded. The explosion blew off the locked back door, badly burning the victims inside. Bothmann's modifications to the execution methods included adding poison to the gasoline used (there is evidence that some red powder and a fluid were delivered from Germany by Maks Sado freight company) in order to kill the prisoners more quickly. Another major change was to murder prisoners in parked vans instead of en route to the forest cremation area.

The Chełmno death factory, which was responsible for the murder of at least 180,000 Jews before the war's end (see Chełmno Trials for supplementary data), operated under Bothmann originally between the summer of 1942 and March 1943. With almost all Jews of the Wartheland District already murdered, the camp was closed in March 1943. Bothmann was sent to Yugoslavia, but a year later he was summoned back to Poznań in order to supervise the renewed extermination operations at Chełmno, because the Łódź Ghetto continued to take in prisoners not only from occupied Poland but also from Germany, Bohemia, Moravia and other places. A total of 70,000 Jews were still there. In this final phase of the camp operation, Bothmann supervised the murder of some 25,000 victims before finally, in mid-July 1944, the SS and police began deporting the remaining inhabitants of the Łódź ghetto to Auschwitz-Birkenau.

In September 1944, the SS brought in new Commando 1005 to exhume and cremate any remaining evidence of genocide. Bothmann took part in the shooting of the last Jewish workers. He fled the forest camp just before the arrival of the Soviet Army. Bothmann also served in the 7th SS-Division Prinz Eugen. His final assignment was in Flensburg with SiPo and the Border Police before the war's end.

== Suicide ==
Captured in West Germany by the British, he hanged himself while in custody, unaware that a life of freedom might have awaited him, similar to other mass murderers (Strippel, Reinefarth, Fiedler). Yet, Hans Bothmann was not alone. He was one of at least a dozen high-profile Nazi German functionaries and Holocaust perpetrators who committed suicide, including Theodor Dannecker ('45), Odilo Globocnik ('45), Richard Glücks ('45), Friedrich Krüger ('45), Ilse Koch ('67), Ernst Grawitz ('45), Karl Jäger ('59), Otto Thierack ('46), Walter Frank ('45), Robert Ley ('45), Manfred von Killinger ('44), and Hans Jeschonnek ('43) among other nationals.

== See also ==
- Chełmno Trials of the Chełmno extermination camp personnel, held in Poland and in Germany following World War II.
- List of people who died by suicide by hanging
