= Szymon Srebrnik =

Polish-Jewish Holocaust survivor

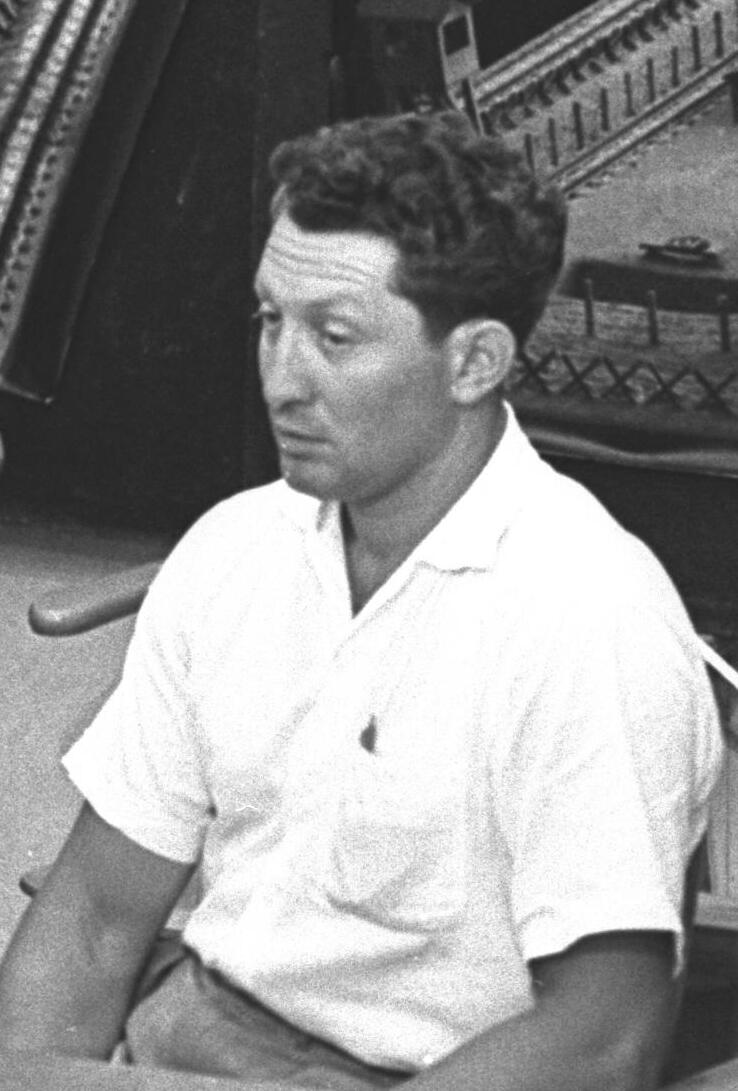
Szymon Srebrnik during the Eichmann trial

Szymon (Shimon, Simon) Srebrnik (April 10, 1930 – August 16, 2006) was a Polish Jew and Holocaust survivor of the Chełmno extermination camp – a German Nazi death camp established in occupied Poland during World War II. Srebrnik escaped after being shot in the back of his head at close range, two days before the Russians arrived in 1945. His testimony along with that of the few other witnesses was critical to the prosecution of camp personnel and other Nazi officials, because of the destruction of evidence by the Germans of their mass extermination of Jews in Chełmno.

At the age of fifteen, Srebrnik testified in June 1945 in the Polish trial of Chełmno personnel. He testified again about Chełmno in the 1961 trial of Adolf Eichmann in Jerusalem, and in the Chełmno trials in Germany (1962–1965) of the former SS men from the SS Special Detachment Kulmhof.

== Life ==
=== Ghetto and camp ===
Srebrnik witnessed his father killed in the Łódź Ghetto. He was thirteen years old when he and his mother were deported to the Chelmno extermination camp. His mother was killed in a gas van. The camp SS selected Simon to work with a Jewish work detail which incinerated bodies of the victims in open-air crematoriums.

Being only 13 and a half, Srebrnik was given the nickname "Spinnefix" (quick spider) by the Germans. During his time in the camp, he participated in the disposal of evidence of genocide. He took part in the gathering of crushed bones and ashes of gassing victims. He helped take the sacks away at night. He rowed a flat-bottomed boat on the Ner River where the sacks were being emptied into the water. While rowing, Srebrnik used to entertain the Nazi SS guards by singing Prussian military songs which they taught him. Srebrnik also won jumping contests and speed races which the SS organized for chained prisoners to participate in. The SS usually killed those who lost.

On January 18, 1945, two days before Soviet troops arrived and liberated the camp, the Germans shot and killed most Jewish Sonderkommando prisoners who took part in the disposal of Holocaust evidence. Despite being shot in the head like the others, Srebrnik survived. According to his own testimony, the German bullet missed the spine ("vital brain centres") and exited through his mouth without substantial blood loss.

He testified about Chełmno at a trial held in Łódź, Poland, in 1945. Later, Srebrnik emigrated to Ness Ziona, Israel.

=== Life in Israel ===
After his emigration to Israel, Srebrnik lived in a Kibbutz and went into military service, eventually taking part in four wars. He and two other survivors of Chełmno testified at the 1961 Adolf Eichmann Trial in Jerusalem (session 66-68). In addition, he testified in the Chełmno Guard Trials, which were conducted in Germany from 1962–1965. He was interviewed by the French filmmaker Claude Lanzmann for his documentary Shoah (1985). Srebrnik died in August 2006 at the Tel Hashomer hospital following a long battle with cancer.
