= Abraham Bomba =

Holocaust Survivor and witness

Abraham Bomba (1913–2000) was a Holocaust survivor and member of the sonderkommando at Treblinka. He is known for his appearance and testimony in Claude Lanzmann's Shoah. At Treblinka he was assigned to the hair sonderkommando, cutting the hair of women just prior to them being murdered in the gas chambers.

== Personal life ==
Bomba was born on 9 June 1913 in Beuthen, Upper Silesia, Germany. His family moved to Czestochowa when he was a young child. He became a barber.

Bomba married Reizl Bomba in 1940 in Czestochowa. They had a son, Berl (1942–1942). Bomba's wife and month-old son were killed shortly after arrival at Treblinka on 23–24 September 1942 on the second transport from Czestochowa.

Following his escape from Treblinka he returned to Czestochowa and married Regina Hamburger. They were enslaved as forced labour for the rest of the war until liberation in January 1945 by Soviet troops. After the war they had a daughter and emigrated first to Israel and then to the United States where he worked as a barber. They followed their daughter back to Israel in the 1970s. Bomba died in 2000.

== At Treblinka ==
On arrival at Treblinka Bomba was selected for forced labour. Initially he was employed as a barber sonderkommando working inside the gas chamber cutting the hair of women prior to their murder. This lasted for 2–3 weeks until the hair sonderkommando were moved from the gas chamber to the undressing barracks. Bomba's work as a barber is recorded in many oral histories, written accounts, and it forms a key part of part two of Shoah.

Bomba and others planned escapes from Treblinka. Bomba and two others escaped in January 1943 by hiding in clothes bundles until after dark and scrambling through the "Lazarett" execution pit. He returned, along with other escapees, to the Czestochowa ghetto.

== Survivor Testimony ==
Bomba testified at the Treblinka Trial, beginning in 1964. He was interviewed in Israel by Claude Lanzmann in September 1979. In these interviews he provided highly detailed witness testimony of the killing process at Treblinka. The Lanzmann interview is notable for a passage where he prompts Bomba repeatedly to recount the incident of a barber cutting the hair of his wife and sister immediately prior to their murder and being unable to warn them.
