= Shoah (film) =

1985 French documentary film by Claude Lanzmann

- US theatrical release poster
- Directed by: Claude Lanzmann
- Starring: Richard Glazar; Raul Hilberg; Filip Müller; Mordechaï Podchlebnik; Simon Srebrnik; Rudolf Vrba
- Cinematography: Dominique Chapuis; Jimmy Glasberg; Phil Gries; William Lubtchansky
- Edited by: Ziva Postec; Anna Ruiz
- Distributed by: New Yorker Films
- Release date: 30 April 1985
- Running time: 566 minutes
- Country: France
- Languages: English; French; German; Hebrew; Polish; Yiddish
- Awards: New York Film Critics Circle Award for Best Non-Fiction Film; BAFTA Award for Best Documentary
- Box office: $20,175

Shoah is a 1985 French documentary film about the Holocaust (known as "Shoah" in Hebrew since the 1940s), directed by Claude Lanzmann. Over nine hours long and eleven years in the making, the film presents Lanzmann's interviews with survivors, witnesses and perpetrators during visits to German Holocaust sites across Poland, including extermination camps.

Released in Paris in April 1985, Shoah is frequently cited as one of the greatest documentaries ever made. It won critical acclaim and several prominent awards, including the New York Film Critics Circle Award for Best Non-Fiction Film and the BAFTA Award for Best Documentary. Simone de Beauvoir hailed it as a "sheer masterpiece", while documentarian Marcel Ophüls called it "the greatest documentary about contemporary history ever made". It has however, received criticism in Poland for example, and the government argued that it accused Poland of "complicity in Nazi genocide".; it has been subject to criticism for its comparative depiction of the Polish population.

Shoah premiered in New York at the Cinema Studio in October 1985 and was broadcast in the United States by PBS over four nights in 1987.

== Synopsis ==
=== Overview ===
The film is concerned chiefly with three topics: the Chełmno extermination camp, where mobile gas vans were first used by Germans to exterminate Jews; the death camps of Treblinka and Auschwitz-Birkenau; and the Warsaw Ghetto, with testimonies from survivors, witnesses and perpetrators.

The sections on Treblinka include testimony from Abraham Bomba, who survived as a barber; Richard Glazar, an inmate; and Franz Suchomel, an SS officer. Bomba breaks down while describing how he came across the wife and sister of a barber friend of his while cutting hair in the gas chamber. This section includes Henryk Gawkowski, who drove transport trains while intoxicated with vodka. Gawkowski's photograph appears on the poster used for the film's marketing campaign.

Testimonies on Auschwitz are provided by Rudolf Vrba, who escaped from the camp before the end of the war; and Filip Müller, who worked in an incinerator burning the bodies from the gassings. Müller recounts what prisoners said to him and describes the experience of personally going into the gas chamber: bodies were piled up by the doors "like stones". He breaks down as he recalls the prisoners starting to sing while being forced into the gas chamber. Accounts include some from local villagers, who witnessed trains heading daily to the camp and returning empty; they quickly guessed the fate of those on board.

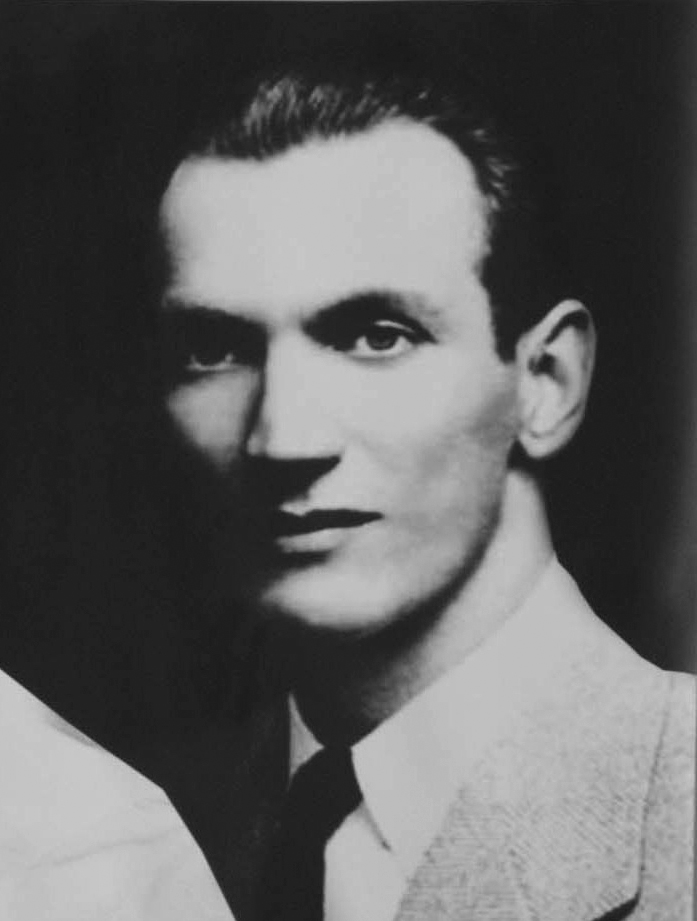
Jan Karski was interviewed by Lanzmann in the winter of 1978–1979 in Washington, D.C.

Lanzmann also interviews bystanders. He asks whether they knew what was going on in the death camps. Their answers reveal that they did, but they justified their inaction by their fear of death. Two survivors of Chełmno are interviewed: Simon Srebnik, who was forced to sing military songs to entertain the Nazis; and Mordechaï Podchlebnik. Lanzmann also has a secretly filmed interview with Franz Schalling, a German security guard, who describes the workings of Chełmno. Walter Stier, a former Nazi bureaucrat, describes the workings of the railways. Stier insists he was simply managing railroad traffic and was not aware that he was transporting Jews directly to their deaths, though he admits to being aware that the destinations were concentration camps.

The Warsaw Ghetto is described by Jan Karski, a member of the Polish Underground who worked for the Polish government-in-exile, and Franz Grassler, a Nazi administrator in Warsaw who liaised with Jewish leaders. A Christian, Karski sneaked into the Warsaw Ghetto and travelled using false documents to England to try to convince the Allied governments to intervene more strongly on behalf of the Jews.

Memories from Jewish survivors of the Warsaw Ghetto Uprising conclude the documentary. Lanzmann also interviews Holocaust historian Raul Hilberg, who discusses the significance of Nazi propaganda against the European Jews and the Nazi development of the Final Solution and a detailed analysis of railroad documents showing the transport routes to the death camps. The complete text of the film was published in 1985.

=== Franz Suchomel ===
Corporal Franz Suchomel, interviewed by Lanzmann in Austria in March 1976, was an SS officer who had worked at Treblinka. Suchomel agreed to be interviewed for 500 Deutschmarks, but refused to be filmed, so Lanzmann used hidden recording equipment while assuring Suchomel that he would not use his name.

Suchomel talks in detail about the camp's gas chambers and the disposal of bodies. He states that he did not know about the extermination at Treblinka until he arrived there. On his first day, he says he vomited and cried after encountering trenches full of corpses, 6–7 m deep, with the earth around them moving in waves because of the gases seeping from the decomposing bodies. The smell of the bodies carried for kilometres depending on the wind, he said, but local people were scared to act in case they were sent to the work camp, Treblinka I.

He explained that from arrival at Treblinka to death in the gas chambers took 2–3 hours for a trainload of people. They would undress, the women would have their hair cut, then they would wait naked outside, including during the winter in minus 10–20 °C, until there was room in the gas chamber. Suchomel told Lanzmann that he would ask the hairdressers to slow down so that the women would not have to wait so long outside.

Compared to the size and complexity of Auschwitz, Suchomel calls Treblinka "primitive. But a well-functioning assembly line of death."

=== Man in the poster ===
The publicity poster for the film features Henryk Gawkowski, a Polish railway worker from Malkinia, who, in 1942–1943 when he was 20–21 years old, worked on the trains to Treblinka as an "assistant machinist with the right to drive the locomotive". Conducted in Poland in July 1978, the interview with Gawkowski is shown 48 minutes into the film, and is the first to present events from the victims' perspective. Lanzmann hired a steam locomotive similar to the one Gawkowski worked on and shows the tracks and a sign for Treblinka.

Gawkowski told Lanzmann that every train had a Polish driver and assistant, accompanied by German officers. What happened was not his fault, he said; had he refused to do the job, he would have been sent to a work camp. He would have killed Hitler himself had he been able to, he told Lanzmann. Lanzmann estimated that 18,000 Jews were taken to Treblinka by the trains Gawkowski worked on. Gawkowski said he had driven Polish Jews there in cargo trains in 1942, and Jews from France, Greece, the Netherlands and Yugoslavia in passenger trains in 1943. A train carrying Jews was called a Sonderzug (special train); the "cargo" was given false papers to disguise that humans were being hauled. The Germans gave the train workers vodka as a bonus when they drove a Sonderzug; Gawkowski drank liberally to make the job bearable.

Gawkowski drove trains to the Treblinka train station and from the station into the camp itself. He said the smell of burning was unbearable as the train approached the camp. The railcars would be driven into the camp by the locomotive in three stages; as he drove one convoy into Treblinka, he would signal to the ones that were waiting by making a slashing movement across his throat. The gesture would cause chaos in those convoys, he said; passengers would try to jump out or throw their children out. Dominick LaCapra wrote that the expression on Gawkowski's face when he demonstrated the gesture for Lanzmann seemed "somewhat diabolical". Lanzmann grew to like Gawkowski over the course of the interviews, writing in 1990: "He was different from the others. I have sympathy for him because he carries a truly open wound that does not heal."

== Production ==
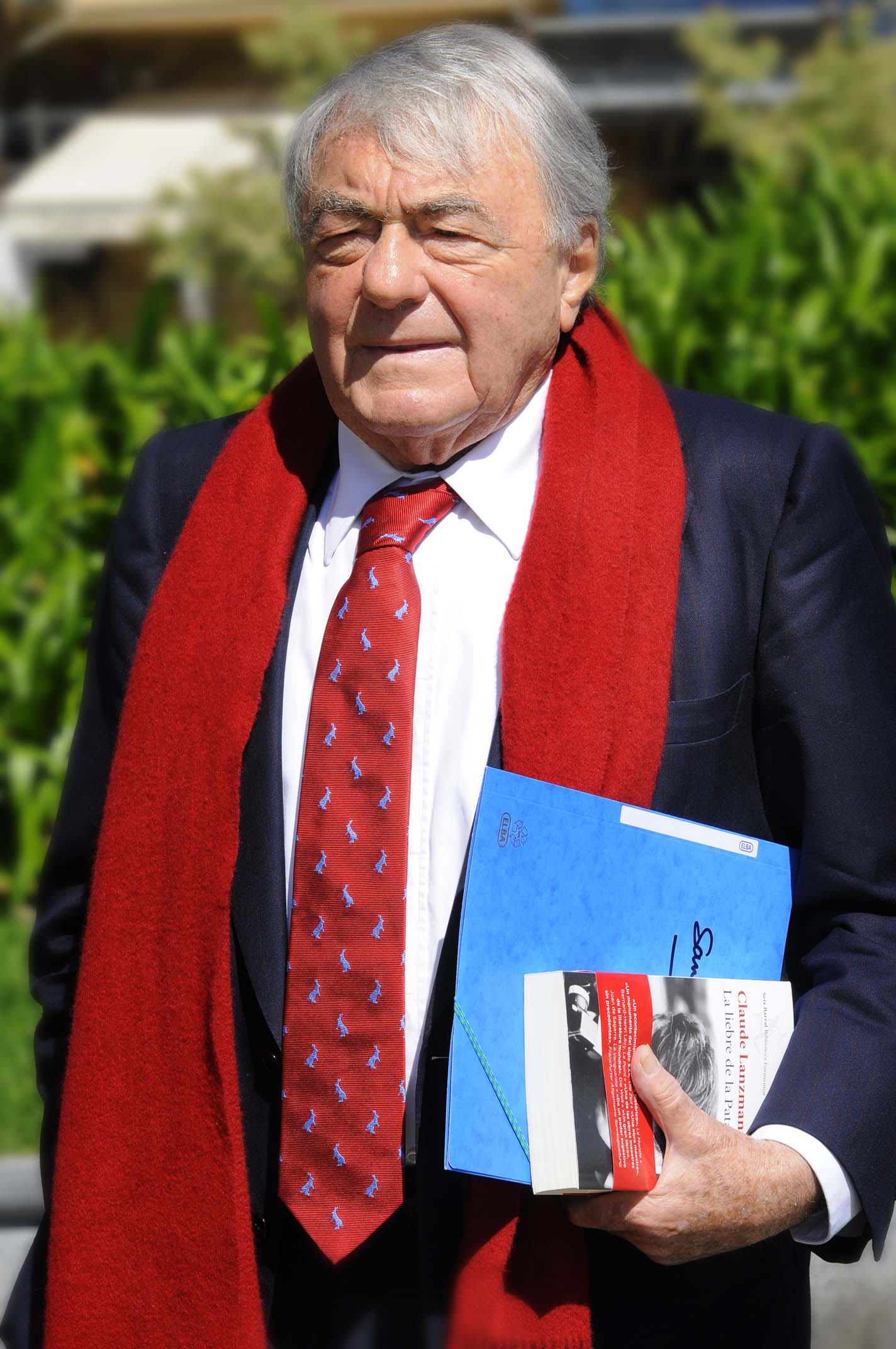
Claude Lanzmann, 2011

Lanzmann was initially commissioned by Israeli officials to make what they thought would be a two-hour film, delivered in 18 months, about the Holocaust from "the viewpoint of the Jews". As time went on, Israeli officials withdrew as his original backers, but Lanzmann persevered, eventually taking eleven years to complete Shoah. The film was plagued by financial problems, difficulties tracking down interviewees, and threats to Lanzmann's life. The film was unusual in that it did not include any historical or archival footage, relying instead on interviews with witnesses and footage of the locations of the extermination camps.

Many German interviewees were reluctant to talk or refused to be filmed, so Lanzmann used a hidden camera, producing a grainy, black-and-white appearance. The interviewees in these scenes are sometimes obscured or distinguished by technicians watching the recording. During one interview, with Heinz Schubert, the covert recording was discovered by Schubert's family, and Lanzmann was physically attacked. He was hospitalized for a month and charged by the authorities with "unauthorized use of the German airwaves".

Lanzmann arranged many of the scenes, but not the testimony, before filming witnesses. For example, Bomba was interviewed while cutting his friend's hair in a working barbershop; a steam locomotive was hired to recreate the journey the death train conductor had taken while transporting Jews; and the opening scene shows Srebnik singing in a rowboat, similarly to how he had "serenaded his captors".

The first six years of production were devoted to the recording of interviews in 14 countries. Lanzmann worked on the interviews for four years before first visiting Poland. After the shooting, editing of the 350 hours of raw footage continued for five years. Lanzmann frequently replaced the camera shot of the interviewee with modern footage from the site of the relevant death camp. The matching of testimony to places became a "crucial trope of the film". Shoah was made without voice-over translations. The questions and answers were kept on the soundtrack, along with the voices of the interpreters, with subtitles where necessary.

The outtakes from Shoah were purchased by the United States Holocaust Memorial Museum in Washington D.C. on October 11, 1996. Museum staff have been engaged in conserving and digitizing 185 hours of interview outtakes and 35 hours of location filming. Transcripts of the interviews, in original languages and English translations, are held by the United States Holocaust Memorial Museum. Videos of excerpts from the interviews are available for viewing online, and linked transcripts can be downloaded from the museum's website.

Five feature-length films were subsequently made by Lanzmann from the Shoah material.

== Reception ==
=== Awards ===
The film received numerous nominations and awards at film festivals around the world. Prominent awards included the New York Film Critics Circle Award for Best Non-Fiction Film in 1985, a special citation at the 1985 Los Angeles Film Critics Association Awards, and the BAFTA Award for Best Documentary in 1986. That year it also won the National Society of Film Critics Award for Best Non-Fiction Film and Best Documentary at the International Documentary Association.

=== Critical response ===
Hailed as a masterpiece by many critics, Shoah was described in The New York Times as "an epic film about the greatest evil of modern times". According to Richard Brody, François Mitterrand attended the first screening in Paris in April 1985 when he was president of France, Václav Havel watched it in prison, and Mikhail Gorbachev arranged public screenings in the Soviet Union in 1989.

In 1985, critic Roger Ebert described it as "an extraordinary film" and "one of the noblest films ever made". He wrote: "It is not a documentary, not journalism, not propaganda, not political. It is an act of witness." Rotten Tomatoes shows a 100% score, based on 37 reviews, with an average rating of 9.4/10. The website's critical consensus states: "Expansive in its beauty as well as its mind-numbing horror, Shoah is a towering – and utterly singular – achievement in cinema." Metacritic reports a 99 out of 100 rating, based on four critics, indicating "universal acclaim". As of July 2019, it is the site's 20th highest-rated film, including re-releases.

Time Out and The Guardian listed Shoah as the best documentary of all time in 2016 and 2013 respectively. In a 2014 British Film Institute (BFI) Sight and Sound poll, film critics voted it second of the best documentary films of all time. In 2012 it ranked 29th and 48th respectively in the BFI's critics' and directors' polls of the greatest films of all time. The same polls in 2022 placed it 27th among critics and 72nd among directors.

==== Mixed reception in Poland ====
The film had critics, however, and it was criticized in Poland, where certain themes were noticed. Mieczysław Biskupski wrote that Lanzmann's "purpose in making the film was revealed by his comments that he 'fears' Poland and that the death camps could not have been constructed in France because the 'French peasantry would not have tolerated them'". Government-run newspapers and state television criticized the film, as did numerous commentators; Jerzy Turowicz, editor of the Catholic weekly Tygodnik Powszechny, called it partial and tendentious. The Socio-Cultural Association of Jews in Poland (Towarzystwo Społeczno-Kulturalne Żydów w Polsce) called it a provocation and delivered a protest letter to the French embassy in Warsaw. Foreign Minister Władysław Bartoszewski, an Auschwitz survivor and an honorary citizen of Israel, criticized Lanzmann for ignoring the thousands of Polish rescuers of Jews, focusing instead on impoverished rural Poles, allegedly selected to conform with his preconceived notions.

Gustaw Herling-Grudziński, a Jewish-Polish writer and dissident, was puzzled by Lanzmann's omission of anybody in Poland with advanced knowledge of the Holocaust. In his book Dziennik pisany nocą, Herling-Grudziński wrote that the thematic construction of Shoah allowed Lanzmann to exercise a reduction method so extreme that the plight of the non-Jewish Poles must remain a mystery to the viewer. Grudziński asked a rhetorical question in his book: "Did the Poles live in peace, quietly plowing farmers' fields with their backs turned on the long fuming chimneys of death-camp crematoria? Or, were they exterminated along with the Jews as subhuman?" According to Grudziński, Lanzmann leaves this question unanswered, but the historical evidence shows that Poles also suffered widespread massacres at the hands of the Nazi German occupation forces.

The American film critic Pauline Kael, whose parents were Jewish immigrants to the U.S. from Poland, called the film "a form of self-punishment", describing it in The New Yorker in 1985 as "logy and exhausting right from the start ..." "Lanzmann did all the questioning himself," she wrote, "while putting pressure on people in a discursive manner, which gave the film a deadening weight." Writing in The New Yorker in 2010, Richard Brody suggested that Kael's "misunderstandings of Shoah are so grotesque as to seem willful."

=== Memory of the World inclusion ===
In 2023, UNESCO added the restored 35mm negative of Shoah, along with 200 hours of interviews recorded on audio cassette, to the Memory of the World international register, recognising it as globally important heritage.

== Home media ==
In 2000, the film was released on VHS, and in 2010 on DVD. Lanzmann's 350 hours of raw footage, along with the transcripts, are available on the website of the United States Holocaust Memorial Museum. The entire 566-minute film was digitally restored and remastered by The Criterion Collection over 2012–13 in 2K resolution, from the original 16 mm negatives. The monaural audio track was remastered without compression. A Blu-ray edition in three disks was then produced from these new masters, including three additional films by Lanzmann.

== Legacy ==
Lanzmann released four feature-length films based on unused material shot for Shoah. The first three are included as bonus features in the Criterion Collection DVD and Blu-ray release of the film. All four are included in the Masters of Cinema Blu-ray release of the film.

- A Visitor from the Living (1997), about a Red Cross representative, Maurice Rossel, who in 1944 wrote a favorable report about the Theresienstadt concentration camp.
- Sobibor, October 14, 1943, 4 p.m. (2001), about Yehuda Lerner, who participated in an uprising against the camp guards and managed to escape.
- The Karski Report (2010), about Polish resistance fighter Jan Karski's visit to Franklin Roosevelt in 1943.
- The Last of the Unjust (2013), about Benjamin Murmelstein, a controversial Jewish rabbi in the Theresienstadt ghetto during World War II.
- Shoah: Four Sisters (2018), a French documentary film that aired as a four-part series on French TV on 23 January 2018. It is both Lanzmann's final film and a continuation of Shoah and chronicles the lives of four women who escaped the concentration camps and tried to find a life after the Holocaust. The four-and-a-half hour cut of the film (nearly half the length of Shoah) debuted in American theaters on 14 November 2018. It was on France's shortlist to compete in the Best Documentary category.

Previously unseen Shoah outtakes have been featured in Adam Benzine's Oscar-nominated HBO documentary Claude Lanzmann: Spectres of the Shoah (2015), which examines Lanzmann's life from 1973 to 1985, the years he spent making Shoah.

Ziva Postec's work as the film's editor was profiled in the 2018 documentary film Ziva Postec: The Editor Behind the Film Shoah (Ziva Postec : La monteuse derrière le film Shoah), by Canadian documentarian Catherine Hébert.

Footage from the documentary was used in the miniseries Exterminate All the Brutes by Raoul Peck, spliced and mixed with imagery of American Slavery and modern Drones in combat to show a connection between the holocaust and western-colonialism.

Director Guillaume Ribot released his documentary All I Had Was Nothingness (Je n'avais que le néant - Shoah par Lanzmann) in 2025. The film comprises outtakes from Shoah and describes Lanzmann's struggle to complete his epic film and the personal toll the project took on him. Sequences convey Lanzmann's initial uncertainty over how to shape his film and his frustrated attempts to get Nazi perpetrators of the Holocaust on camera. The voice-over of the documentary is taken from Lanzmann's memoir The Patagonian Hare.

== See also ==
- List of Holocaust films
- List of longest films
- List of films shot over three or more years
- List of films with a 100% rating on Rotten Tomatoes
