= Mordechaï Podchlebnik =

Holocaust survivor

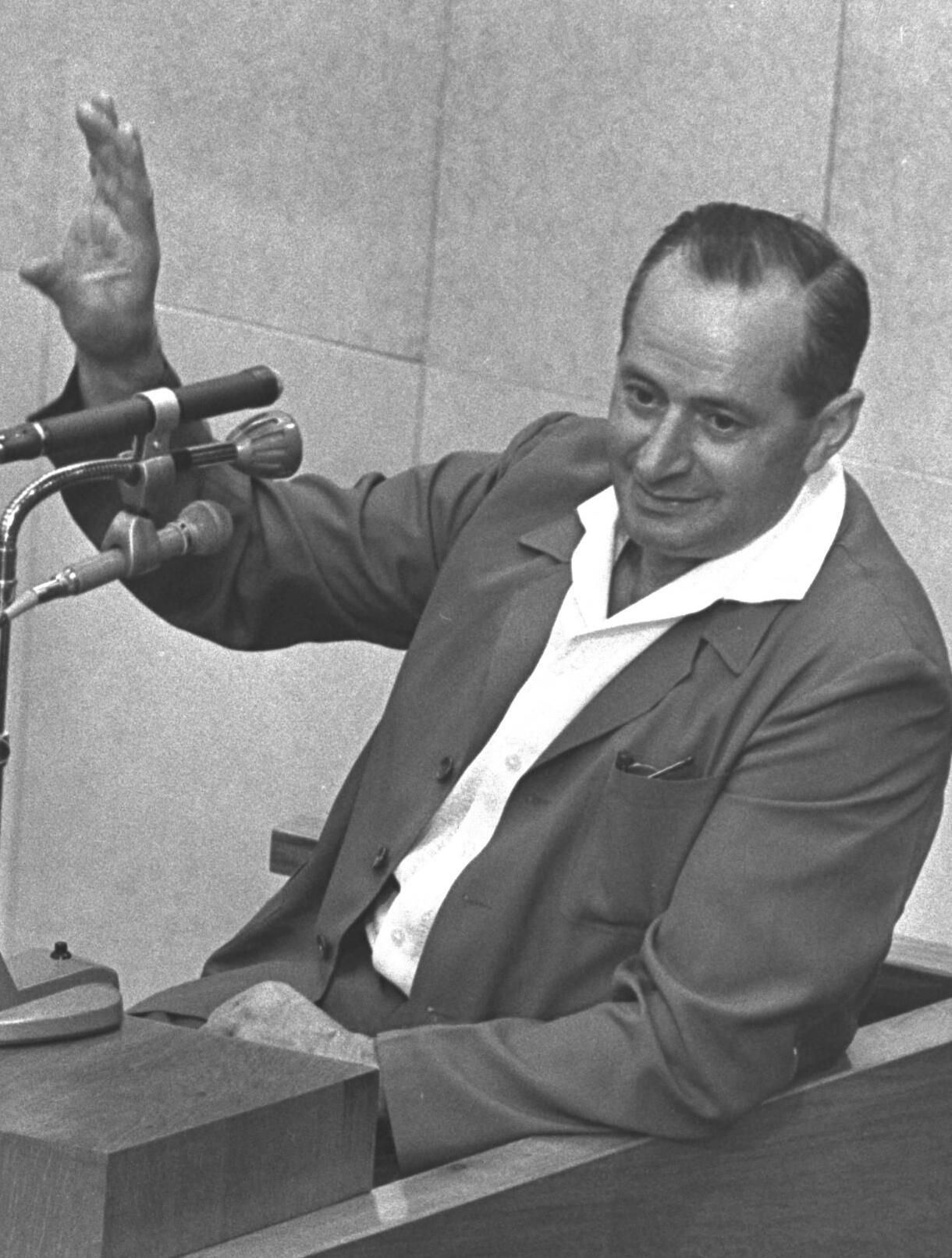
Michał Podchlebnik during the Eichmann trial

Mordechaï Podchlebnik or Michał Podchlebnik (1907–1985) was a Polish Jew and Holocaust survivor. He was a member of the Sonderkommando work detail for nearly two weeks at the Chełmno extermination camp in occupied Poland. Podchlebnik was one of three who escaped into the surrounding forest from the mass burial zone out of a population of 400,000 prisoners.

== Life ==
He was born to a family of Jacob Podchlebnik and Sosia (Zosia) née Widawska from Koło, known also by the Polish equivalent of his first name, Michał. He witnessed the deportation of his father, mother, sister with her five children, and brother with his own wife and three children. Podchlebnik became a key witness in 1945 at the Chełmno Trials of the former SS men from the SS Special Detachment Kulmhof. Decades later in 1961 he gave testimony at the Eichmann trial in Jerusalem. Podchlebnik was also interviewed by Claude Lanzmann for the documentary film Shoah.
