= Fort VII =

Nazi death camp and museum in Poland

Coordinates: 52°25′01″N 16°52′05″E

Fort VII Konzentrationslager Posen
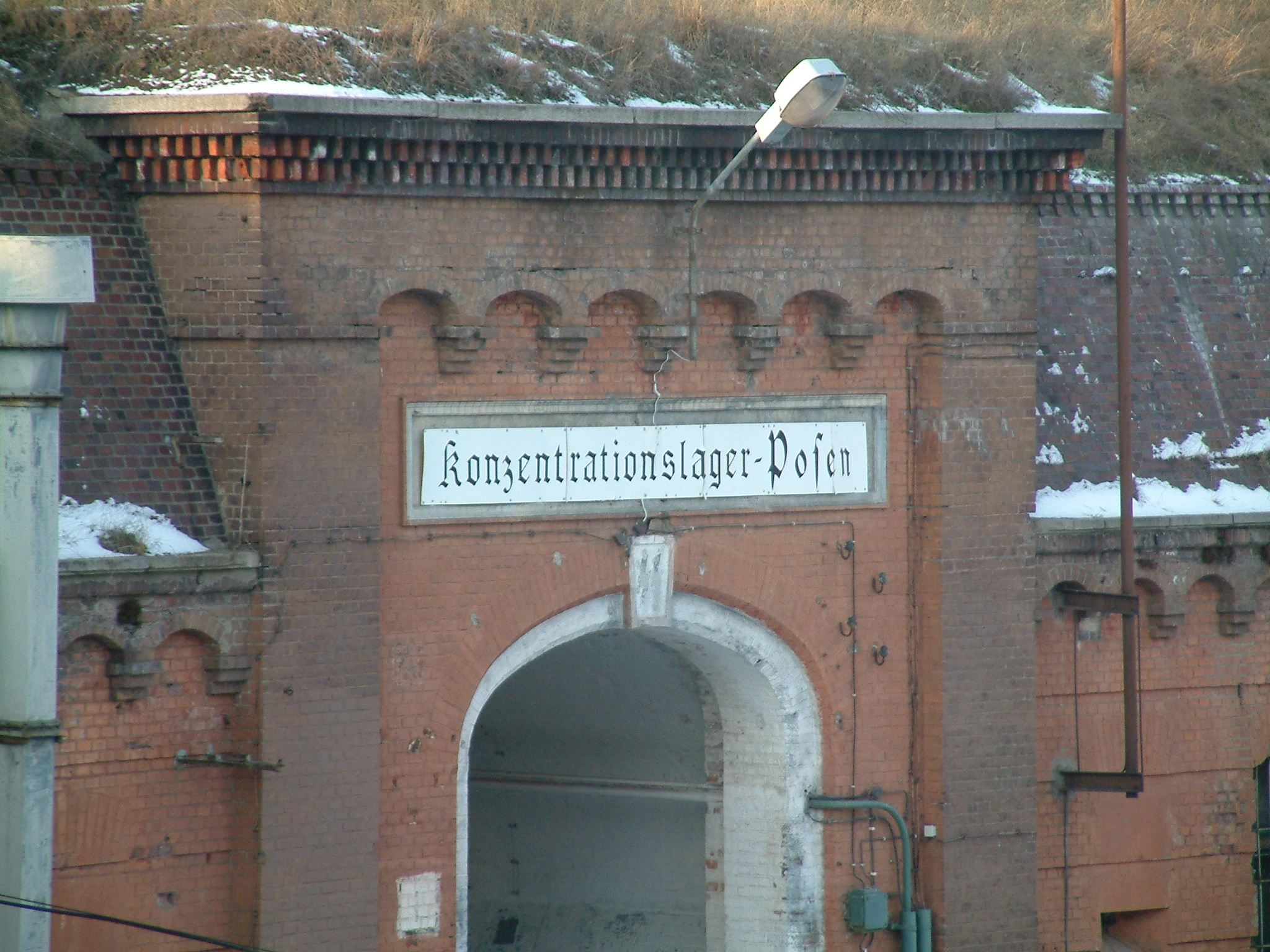
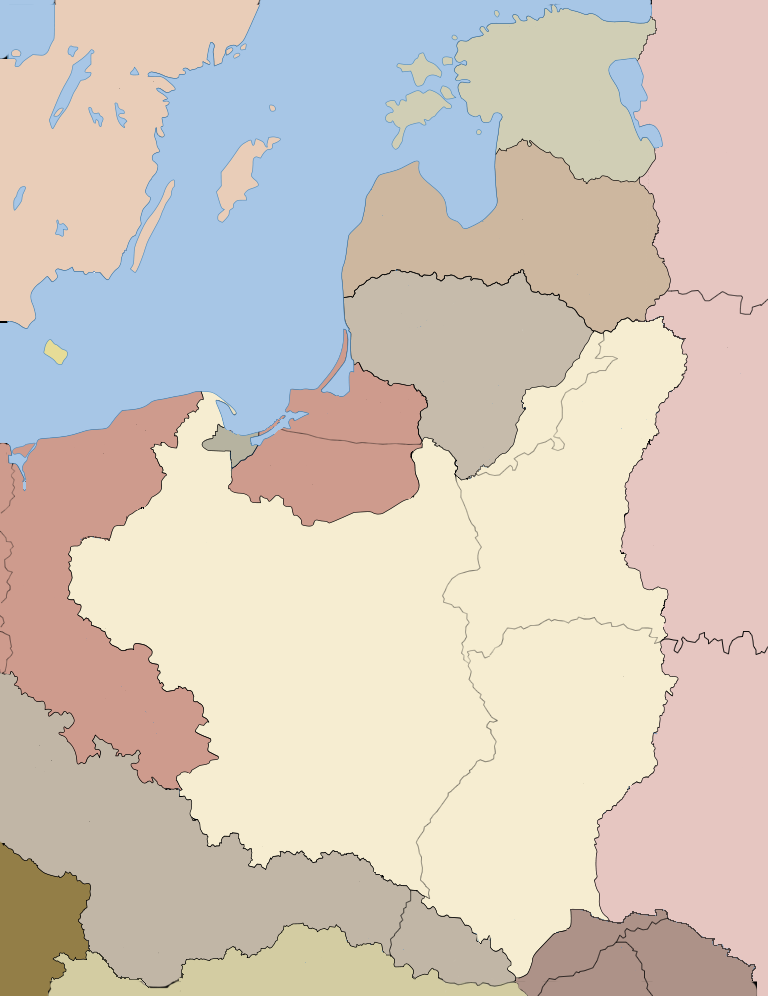
- The main entrance to the fort, with the Konzentrationslager Posen sign Location of Poznań on the map of the Second Polish Republic from before the German-Soviet invasion.
- Date: October 1939 – 1944
- Location: Occupied Poland
- Cause: Invasion of Poland
- Participants: Gestapo, SS
- Casualties: Minimum of 4,500 Polish civilians including patients and staff of psychiatric hospitals in Poznań and Owińska

Fort VII, officially Konzentrationslager Posen (renamed later), was a Nazi concentration camps set up in Poznań in German-occupied Poland during World War II, located in one of the 19th-century forts circling the city. According to different estimates, between 4,500 and 20,000 people, mostly Poles from Poznań and the surrounding region, died while imprisoned at the camp.

== Camp establishment ==
The decades-old Fort VII (also known as Fort Colomb from 1902 to 1918) was one of the ring of defensive forts built around the perimeter of Poznań by the Prussian authorities in the late 19th century, in the second stage of their Festung Posen plan. It was built in 1876–1880 (with improvements in 1887–1888). At present, it stands in the western part of the city, on today's ul. Polska in the Ogrody neighbourhood, part of Jeżyce district. In the interwar period it was used for storage purposes.

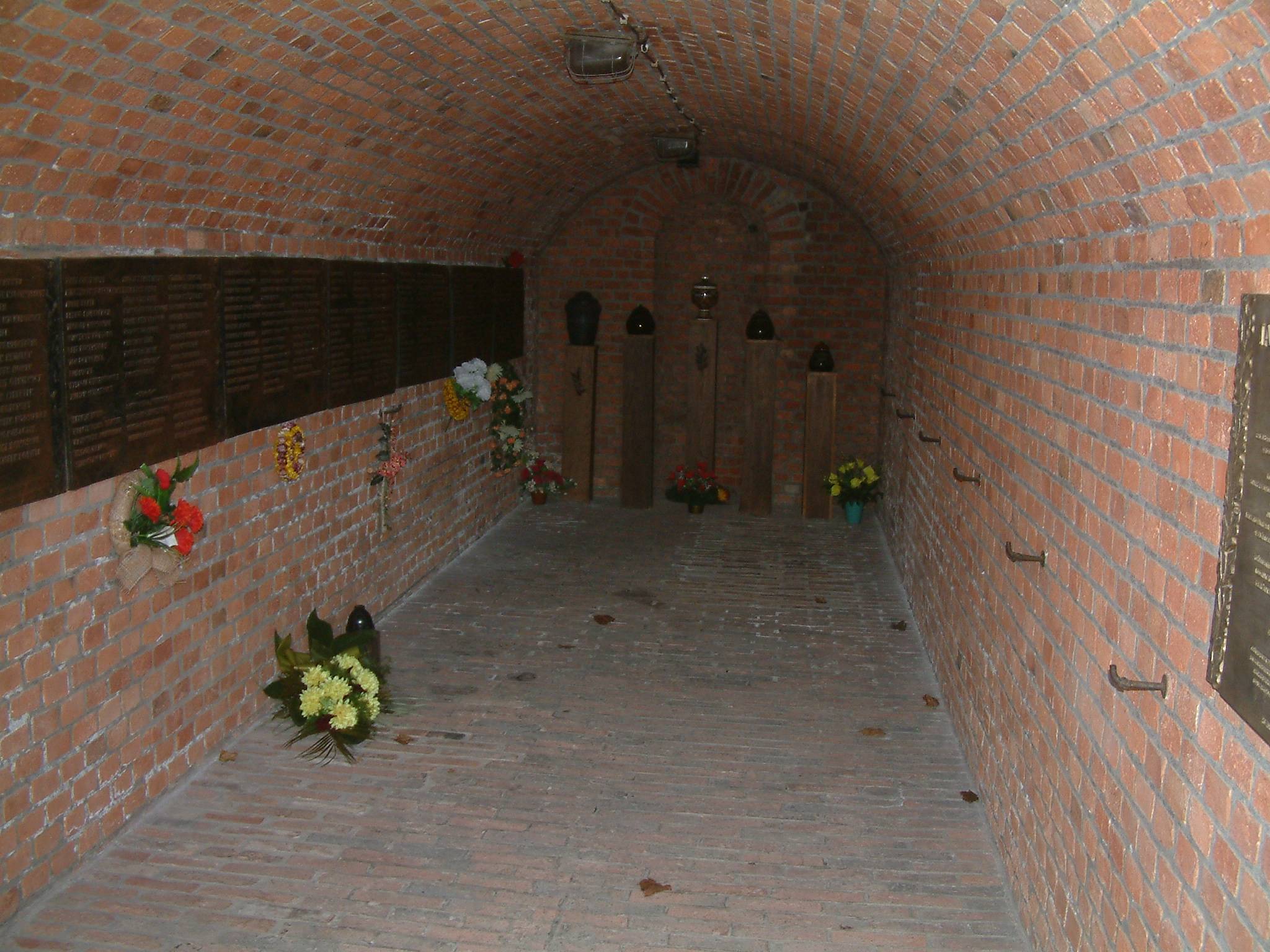
Experimental gas chamber at Bunker No. 17

Following the German invasion of Poland in September 1939, Fort VII was chosen as the site of the first concentration camp in occupied Poland, called Konzentrationslager Posen. It was probably created by decision of the Reichsstatthalter of the Poznań region, Arthur Greiser. It began functioning at some time around October 1939. The prisoners were mostly Poles from the Wielkopolska region. Many were representatives of the region's intelligentsia, often people who had been engaged in social and political life, as well as known Polish patriots and veterans of the Wielkopolska Uprising (1918–1919) and Silesian Uprisings. In the early stages of the camp's existence prisoners were generally executed within a week of arrival. In October 1939 an early experiment in execution by gas chamber was carried out by an SS chemist, Dr. August Becker,^{[p. 175]} whereby around 400 patients and staff from psychiatric hospitals in Poznań were gassed at Bunker No. 17. The extermination of mentally ill was conducted by SS-Sturmbannführer Herbert Lange of the Gestapo in occupied Poznań. Lange served with Einsatzgruppe VI during Operation Tannenberg. He and his men were responsible also for the murder of 2,750 patients at Kościan, about 1,100 patients at Owińska, as well as 1,558 patients and 300 civilian Poles at Działdowo; the experience gained allowed Lange to become the first commandant of Chełmno extermination camp (until April 1942).

In mid November 1939 the camp was renamed as a Gestapo prison and a transit camp (Geheime Staatspolizei Staatspolizeileitstelle Posen. Übergangslager – Fort VII). In this period prisoners usually remained in the camp for about six months, before being sentenced to death, a long prison term or transfer to a larger concentration camp, such as Dachau and Auschwitz, or in rare cases being released. Prisoners in this period included political and military activists in the Polish Underground State.

Following Himmler's decree of 28 May 1941 the camp was renamed as a police prison and corrective labour camp (Polizeigefängnis der Sicherheitspolizei und Arbeitserziehungslager). In this period some prisoners (called niedzielnicy in Polish, from the word niedziela, "Sunday") would be held in the camp temporarily between ending work on Saturday and beginning work on Monday.

== Prisoner numbers and deaths ==
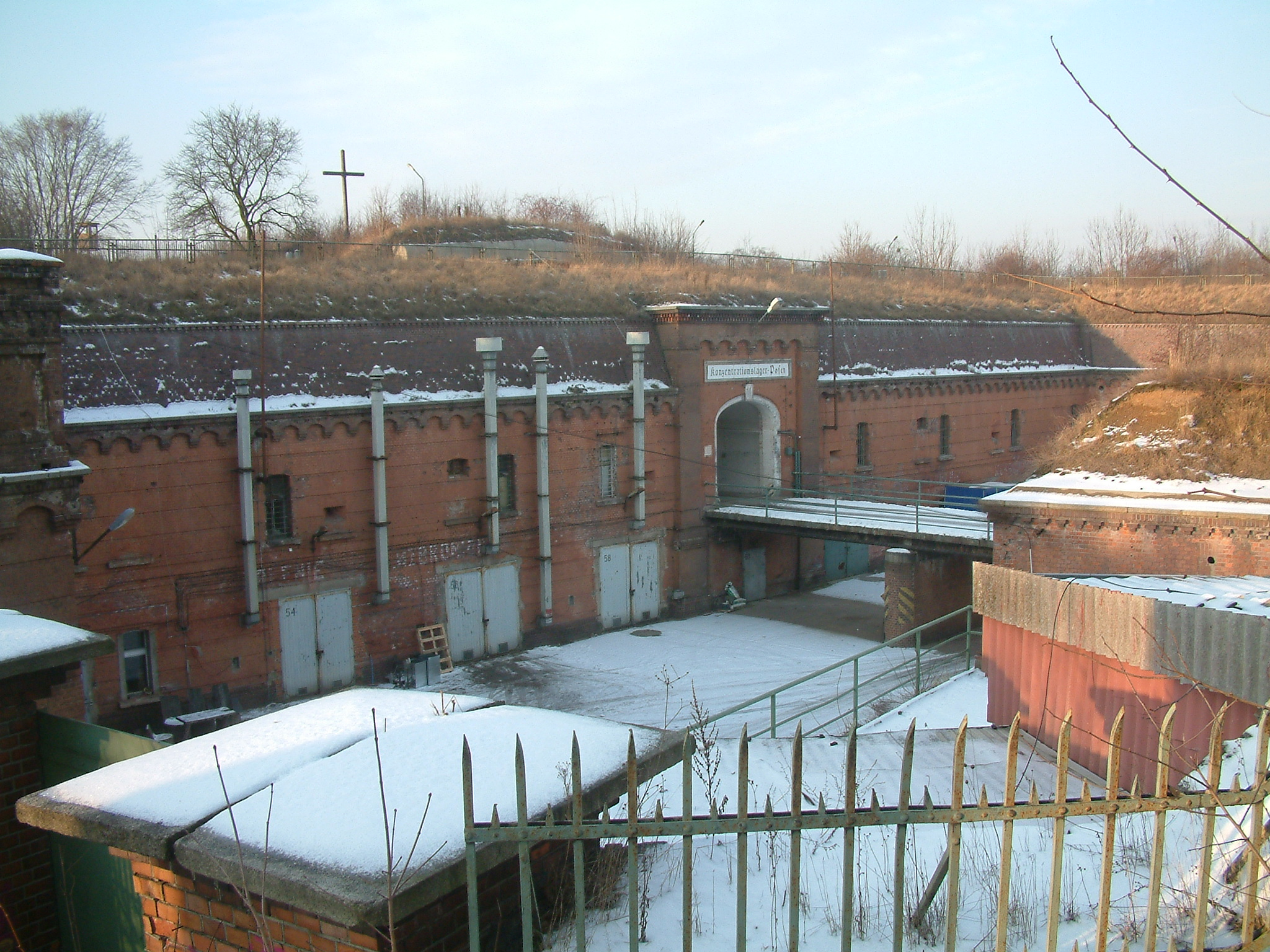
View of the main entrance

About 2,000 to 2,500 prisoners were held at the camp at any one time, guarded by approximately 400 members of the SS. There were 27 cells for men and three for women. According to conservative estimates of the Fort VII State Museum, a total of 18,000 prisoners passed through the camp, of whom 4,500 died. Other estimates put the total number of prisoners as high as 45,000, and the number of deaths at around 20,000. Deaths were the result of either to execution: including shooting, hanging or gassing; mistreatment, torture, and contagious disease.

On the 20 October 1939 the first Jewish victims from Posen (Poznań), Benno Rindfleisch and Julius Tychauer, were shot at Fort VII. Several more Jews were shot in the same month in Poznań and in nearby Buk and Kornik. But the majority of the Jewish population of Posen was transported to the Lublin district, most likely ultimately perishing at Belzec or Sobibor. The prison's documentation was destroyed near the end of the war. According to reports submitted by the prison to the register of deaths, the official number of prisoners who died at Fort VII was 479. Prisoners included citizens of other countries as well as Polish nationals, from the Soviet Union, Yugoslavia, France, the United Kingdom, as well as some Germans.

== Conditions ==
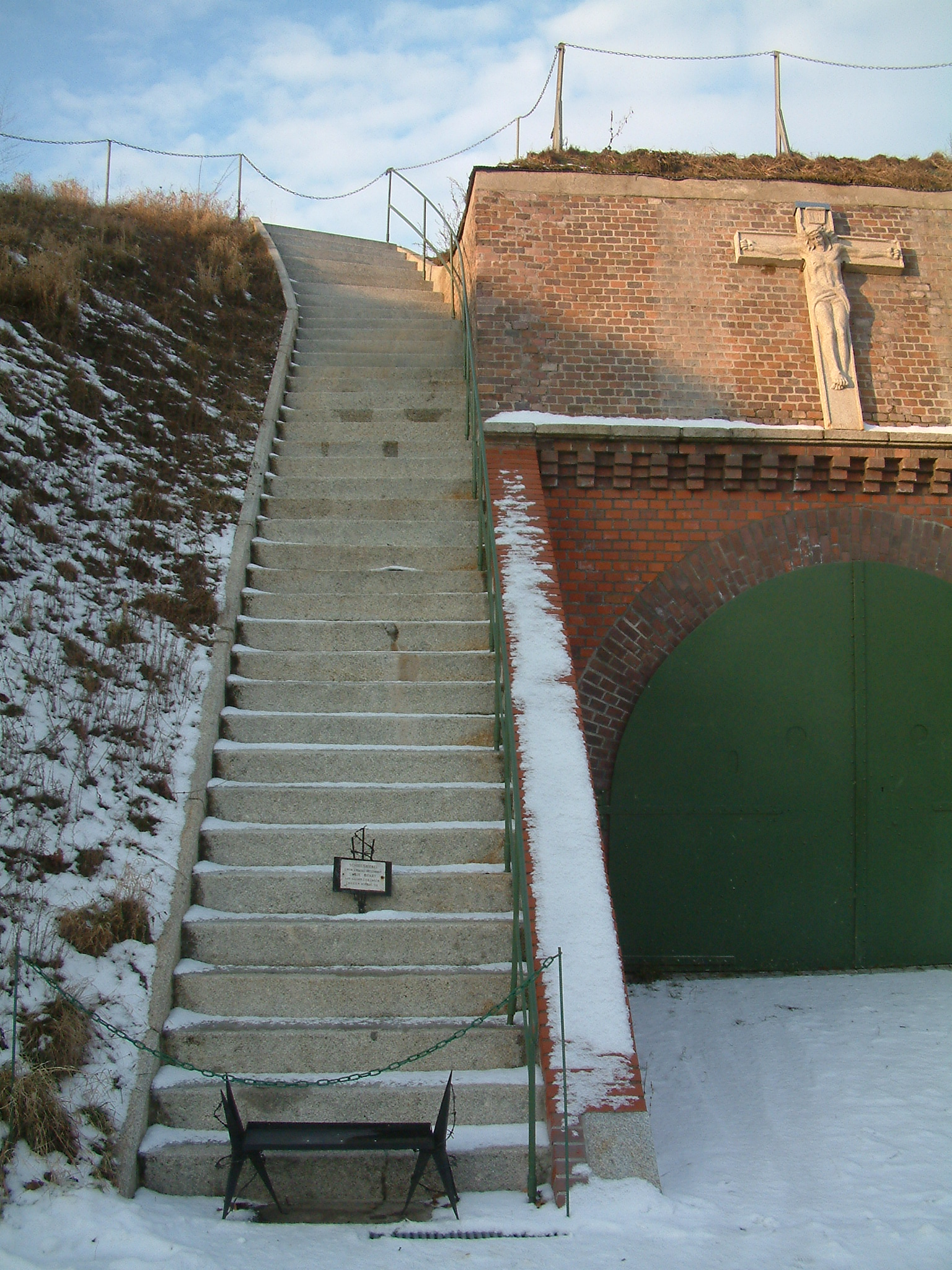
The "stairway of death"

Fort VII was known among prisoners as a particularly harsh camp, partly because of the high ratio of guards to prisoners (about one to five). Prisoners lived in cramped, dark, damp and cold conditions. Sometimes 200–300 prisoners were held in a cell measuring 20 by 5 metres. The women's cells, located below ground level, sometimes remained flooded up to knee height.

Until mid-1942 prisoners slept on the floor or on rotting straw. There was little or no access to washing facilities, and parasites and disease spread easily. Prisoners were subjected to torture and humiliation by the guards. On the "stairway of death" prisoners would be made to run up carrying a heavy stone, and possibly kicked down from the top by a guard. Food rations were minimal, as officially the prisoners were not working. However, some of them were made to work in unofficial workshops. Only one prisoner is known to have escaped – Marian Szlegel, thanks to his work, was able to identify a time when the camp was less well guarded, and took the opportunity to abscond.

Witness accounts speak of 7 to 9 executions by shooting a day, as well as mass hangings, and shootings of larger groups away from the fort itself. There were two typhus epidemics, each of which killed about 80% of the prisoners held at that time. Many prisoners also died after being taken to other concentration camps.

== Closure of the camp ==
From March 1943 the process of gradually liquidating the camp began, so that the site could be used for industrial purposes. Prisoners were made to work on the construction of a new camp south of Poznań, in Żabikowo (called Poggenburg by the Germans), and were then transferred there, the last ones being moved on 25 April 1944. Fort VII became a Telefunken factory producing radio equipment for submarines and aircraft.

After the war the building was used as a storage facility by the Polish army. Plans were made in 1976 to turn the site into a museum in memory of the victims of the camp. The museum opened on 13 August 1979, and is called Muzeum Martyrologii Wielkopolan Fort VII ("Fort VII Museum of the Wielkopolska Martyrs").

== See also ==
- List of Nazi concentration camps
- Nazi crimes against the Polish nation
