= Herbert Lange =

German SS officer (1909–1945)

- Lange before World War II
- Born: 29 September 1909; Menzlin, Ziethen, German Empire
- Died: 20 April 1945 (aged 35); Bernau bei Berlin, Germany
- Military career
- Branch: Schutzstaffel
- Service years: 1932–1945
- Rank: SS-Sturmbannführer
- Units: SS-Totenkopfverbände
- Commands: Chełmno extermination camp (November 1941 – April 1942)

Herbert Lange (29 September 1909 – 20 April 1945) was a member of the German SS during the Nazi era. He was the commandant of Chełmno extermination camp until April 1942, as well as the leader of the SS Special Detachment Lange, in charge of the extermination of Jews from the Łódź Ghetto. Lange was responsible for numerous crimes against humanity, including the murder of mentally disabled patients in Poland and in Germany during the Aktion T4 "euthanasia" programme. He was one of the main perpetrators of the Holocaust.

== Biography ==
Lange studied law, however he failed to obtain a degree. He joined the NSDAP (Nazi Party) on 1 May 1932. He enlisted in the Sturmabteilung (SA) three months later, and in 1933, he joined the Schutzstaffel (SS). Soon after, he joined the Kriminalpolizei (the Nazi police force), becoming a deputy commissioner in 1935.

== Crimes against humanity ==
Lange entered Poland with Einsatzgruppe Naumann (EG VI) during the September campaign. On 9 November 1939, following a Nazi German victory, Lange was promoted to the rank of SS-Untersturmführer (2nd lieutenant) in occupied Poland and posted in charge of the Gestapo in occupied Poznań. In the beginning of 1940 he assumed command of an SS-Sonderkommando Lange, named after him and tasked with the murder of mentally ill in Wartheland area (Wielkopolska) under the direction of SS-Standartenführer Ernst Damzog and SS-Obergruppenführer Wilhelm Koppe. Lange served with Einsatzgruppe VI during Operation Tannenberg. Already by mid-1940, he and his men were responsible for the murder of about 1,100 patients in Owińska, 2,750 patients at Kościan, 1,558 patients and 300 Poles at Działdowo, and hundreds of Poles at Fort VII where the mobile gas-chamber (Einsatzwagen) was invented. Their earlier hospital victims were usually shot in the back of the neck. The unit, equipped with a gas van, shuttled between hospitals, picking up patients and killing them with carbon monoxide.

After his promotion to SS-Obersturmführer (1st lieutenant) on 20 April 1940, his unit was permanently stationed at the Soldau concentration camp. In one special case, Wilhelm Rediess hired Kommando Lange to kill 1,558 mental patients from East Prussia for ten Reichsmarks a head. By December 1941 Lange was a SS-Hauptsturmführer (captain) and was appointed commander of the Chełmno death camp by then SS-Standartenführer Ernst Damzog, the Inspekteur der Sicherheitspolizei und des SD in Posen (today, Poznań). Lange held that position until March 1942. His commando was tasked with the liquidation of 100,000 Jews from the Warthegau via Ghetto Litzmannstadt. In April 1942, Lange's unit was renamed SS Sonderkommando Kulmhof and introduced improvements to the killing process at Chełmno. Lange constructed cremation pits to replace mass graves. He was succeeded by Hans Bothmann who formed Special Detachment Bothmann in 1942. At a very minimum 152,000 people (Bohn) were killed at the camp, though the West German prosecution, citing Nazi figures during the Chełmno trials of 1962–65, laid charges for at least 180,000 victims.

Upon the completion of his task in 1942, Lange was transferred to the Reichssicherheitshauptamt (Reich Main Security Office) and served under Arthur Nebe as a Kriminalrat (Criminal Investigator). In 1944, Lange aided in catching the conspirators who attempted to assassinate Hitler as part of the 20 July Plot, leading to his promotion to SS-Sturmbannführer. One of the conspirators he interrogated was Peter Bielenberg. In her book The Past Is Myself, Peter Bielenberg's wife Christabel Bielenberg describes her own interrogation by Lange.

Lange was killed in action at Bernau bei Berlin during the Battle of Berlin on 20 April 1945.

== Sources ==
- Friedlander, Henry (1997) [1995]. The Origins of Nazi Genocide: From Euthanasia to the Final Solution. Univ of North Carolina Press. ISBN 978-0807846759.
- Montague, Patrick (2012). Chelmno and the Holocaust: The History of Hitler's First Death Camp. I.B.Tauris. pp. 188–190. ISBN 978-1848857223.
