= Gas van =

Vehicle used for mass murder, especially during the Holocaust

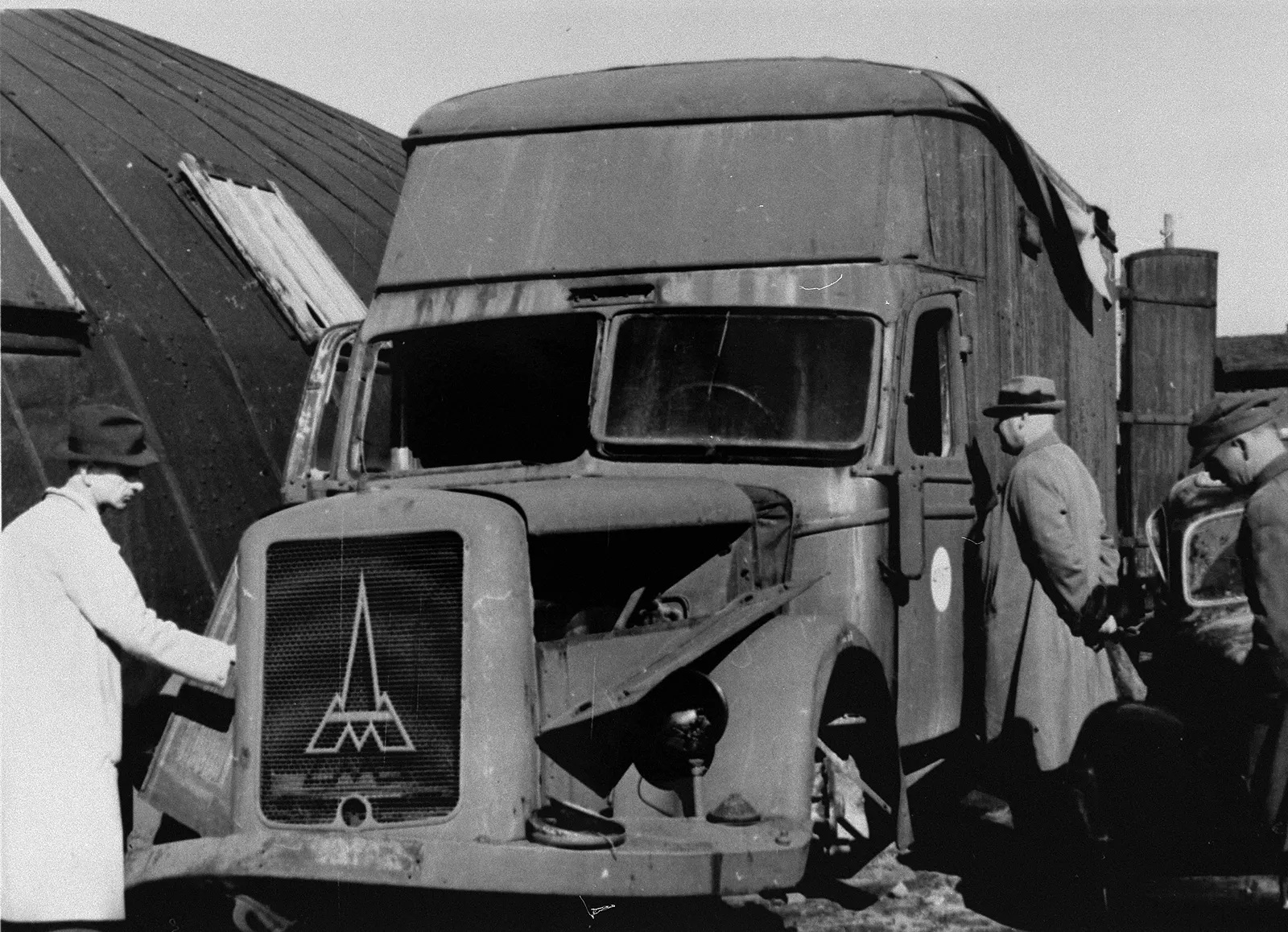
Burned-out Magirus-Deutz furniture mover van near Chełmno extermination camp. This van had not been modified, as explained by Office of the United States Chief Counsel for Prosecution of Axis Criminality (1946), but can help the reader visualize the process.

A gas van or gas wagon (Russian: душегубка, romanized: dushegubka, lit. 'soul killer'; Serbian: душегупка, romanized: dušegupka; German: Gaswagen) was a truck re-equipped as a mobile gas chamber. During World War II and the Holocaust, Nazi Germany developed and used gas vans on a large scale to kill inmates of asylums, Romani people, Jews, and prisoners in occupied Poland, Belarus, Serbia, the Soviet Union, and other regions of German-occupied Europe. There are several documented cases of gas vans used by Soviet NKVD during the Great Purge.

== History ==
=== Nazi Germany ===
The use of gas vans by Germans to kill Jews, Poles, Romany people, the mentally ill people, and prisoners in occupied territories during World War II originated with Aktion T4 in 1939 that targeted disabled adults and children. Ordered to find a suitable method to kill, the Technical Institute for the Detection of Crime ("Kriminaltechnisches Institut der Sicherheitspolizei" (de), abbreviated KTI) of the Reichssicherheitshauptamt (RSHA) decided to gas victims with carbon monoxide.

In October 1939, the Nazis started gassing prisoners at Fort VII near Posen. The first victims were Polish and Jewish inmates of asylums for the mentally ill. Witnesses report that from December 1939, mobile gas chambers were used to murder the inmates of asylums in Pomerania, Eastern Prussia and Poland. The vans were built for the Sonderkommando Lange and their use was supposed to speed up the killings. Instead of transporting the victims to the gas chambers, the gas chambers were transported to the victims. They were most likely devised by specialists from the Referat II D of the RSHA. These mobile gas chambers worked on the same principles as the stationary gas chambers: through a rubber hose the driver released pure CO from steel cylinders into the air tight special construction that was shaped like a box and placed on the carrier. The vans resembled moving vans or delivery lorries and were labelled Kaiser's Kaffee Geschäft (de) ("Kaiser's Coffee Shop") for camouflage. They were not called "gas vans" at the time, but "Sonder-Wagen", "Spezialwagen" (special vans) and "Entlausungswagen" (delousing vans). The Lange commando killed patients in numerous hospitals in the Wartheland in 1940. They drove to the hospitals, collected patients, loaded them into the vans and gassed them while they were driving them away. From 21 May to 8 June 1940 the Sonderkommando Lange murdered 1558 sick people from Soldau concentration camp.

In August 1941, SS chief Heinrich Himmler attended a demonstration of a mass-shooting of Jews in Minsk that was arranged by Arthur Nebe, after which he vomited. Regaining his composure, Himmler decided that alternative murder techniques should be found. He ordered Nebe to explore more "convenient" ways of killing, less stressful for the killers. Nebe decided to conduct his experiments by murdering Soviet mental patients, first with explosives near Minsk, and then with automobile exhaust at Mogilev. Nebe's experiments led to the development of the gas van. This vehicle had already been used in 1940 for the gassing of East Prussian and Pomeranian mental patients in the Soldau concentration camp.

Gas vans were used, particularly at the Chełmno extermination camp, until gas chambers were developed as a more efficient method for murdering large numbers of people. Two types of gas vans were used by the Einsatzgruppen in the East. The Opel-Blitz, which weighed 3.5 tons, and the larger Saurerwagen, which weighed 7 tons. In Belgrade, the gas van was known as "Dušegupka" and in the occupied parts of the USSR similarly as "душегубка" (dushegubka, literally "soul killer" or "exterminator"). The SS used the euphemisms Sonderwagen, Spezialwagen or S-Wagen ("special vehicle") for the vans. The gas vans were specifically designed to direct deadly exhaust fumes via metal pipes into the airtight cargo compartments, where the intended victims had been forcibly stuffed to capacity. When the gas was released, victims screamed and knocked on the walls, begging for the Germans to release them. After their deaths, their bodies were "thrown out blue, wet with sweat and urine, the legs covered with excrement and menstrual blood". These symptoms were one of the reasons why Rudolf Höss chose Zyklon B as the primary killing method for Jews, as it was believed that it would cause death without such disturbing symptoms. However according to some accounts, Zyklon B did cause similar effects.

By June 1942 the main producer of gas vans, Gaubschat Fahrzeugwerke GmbH, had delivered 20 gas vans in two models (for 30–50 and 70–100 individuals) to Einsatzgruppen, out of 30 that were ordered from that company. Not one gas van was extant at the end of the war. The existence of gas vans first came to light in 1943 during the trial of Nazi collaborators who had been involved in the murder of civilians in Krasnodar. A group of 30 to 60 civilians were gassed on August 21 and 22, 1942 by members of SS-Sonderkommando 10a of Einsatzgruppe D, who were supported by local collaborators. Subsequently, gas vans were used for murder of Romany people and ill persons. The total number of gas van killings is unknown.

The gas vans are extensively discussed in some of the interviews in Claude Lanzmann's film Shoah.

=== Soviet Union ===
According to historian Robert Gellately, "the Soviets sometimes used a gas van (dushegubka), as in Moscow during the 1930s, but how extensive that was needs further investigation", while Nazi killers have "invented the first gas van, which began operations in the Warthegau on January 15, 1940, under Herbert Lange".

During the Great Purge in the Soviet Union, NKVD officer Isaj D. Berg used a specially adapted airtight van for gassing prisoners to death on an experimental basis. The prisoners were gassed on the way to Butovo, a phony firing range, where the NKVD executed its prisoners and buried them. According to testimony given by NKVD officer Nikolai Kharitonov in 1956, Isaj Berg had been instrumental in the production of gas vans. Berg had become chief of the administrative economic department in Moscow's NKVD in the summer of 1937. In October 1937 he was charged with the supervision of the Butovo firing range. Berg had to prepare Butovo for the mass execution of people from greater Moscow and to ensure that these executions would take place smoothly. According to testimony given by Fjodor Tschesnokov, a member of Berg's execution team, in 1956, trucks were used, which were equipped with valves through which the gas could be directed inside the vehicles. The interrogations revealed that the prisoners were stripped naked, tied up, gagged and thrown into the trucks. Their property was stolen. Berg was arrested on 3 August 1938 and sentenced to death for participating in a "counter-revolutionary conspiracy within the NKVD" and executed on 3 March 1939.

The scale at which these trucks were used is unknown. Author Tomas Kizny assumes that they were in use while Berg oversaw the executions (October 1937 to 4 August 1938). He points to archaeological excavations conducted in 1997. Then 59 corpses were exhumed who most likely had been murdered during Berg's tenure. Only four of these victims had been shot in the head, which leads Kizny to conclude that at least some of them had been gassed. FSB officers Alexander Mikhailov and Mikhail Kirillin, and historian Lydia Golovkova, recounted the testimony of one witness at a mass execution site outside Moscow. As many as 50 prisoners were loaded into trucks whose exhaust pipes were turned into the trucks, which Muscovites called "soul killers" and which were said to have been invented by Berg. Prisoners were "half dead" when they arrived at the site, where most were subsequently executed.

=== Invention of the gas van ===
Historians of the Holocaust like Henry Friedlander argue that the mobile gas chambers were invented in Germany in 1940, and they were first used to murder patients of Wartheland hospitals. Katrin Reichelt names Albert Widmann and Arthur Nebe as having developed the method. The vans themselves were modified by Walter Rauff, Friedrich Pradel and Harry Wentritt. Matthias Beer calls gas vans "a special product of the Third Reich".

Robert Gellately points out that during a euthanasia program in occupied Poland the Nazi killers sought a more efficient and secretive killing process and thus "invented the first gas van, which began operations in the Warthegau on January 15, 1940, under Herbert Lange". He also notes, that "the Soviets sometimes used a gas van (dushegubka), as in Moscow during the 1930s, but how extensive that was needs further investigation. They used crematoriums to dispose of thousands of bodies, but had no gas chambers."

Journalist Yevgenia Albats maintains that gas vans were a "Soviet invention". Kizny names Berg as the "inventor".

== See also ==
- Execution van
- August Becker

== Bibliography ==
- Alberti, Michael (2006). Die Verfolgung und Vernichtung der Juden im Reichsgau Wartheland 1939-1945 (in German). Wiesbaden: Otto Harrassowitz Verlag. ISBN 978-3-447-05167-5.
- Beer, Mathias (1987). "Die Entwicklung der Gaswagen beim Mord an den Juden" (PDF). Vierteljahrshefte für Zeitgeschichte (in German). 35 (3): 403–417.
- Colton, Timothy J. (1995). Moscow: Governing the Socialist Metropolis. Cambridge, Massachusetts: Harvard University Press. ISBN 978-0-674-58749-6.
- Friedlander, Henry (1997). The Origins of Nazi Genocide: From Euthanasia to the Final Solution. Chapel Hill: Univ of North Carolina Press. ISBN 978-0-8078-4675-9.
- Merridale, Catherine (2002). Night of Stone: Death and Memory in Twentieth-Century Russia. New York: Penguin. ISBN 978-0-14-200063-2.
- Vatlin, Alexander (2016). Seth Bernstein (ed.). Agents of Terror: Ordinary Men and Extraordinary Violence in Stalin's Secret Police. Madison, Wisconsin: University of Wisconsin Press. ISBN 978-0-299-31080-6.
