= Działdowo =

Town in Warmian-Masurian Voivodeship, Poland

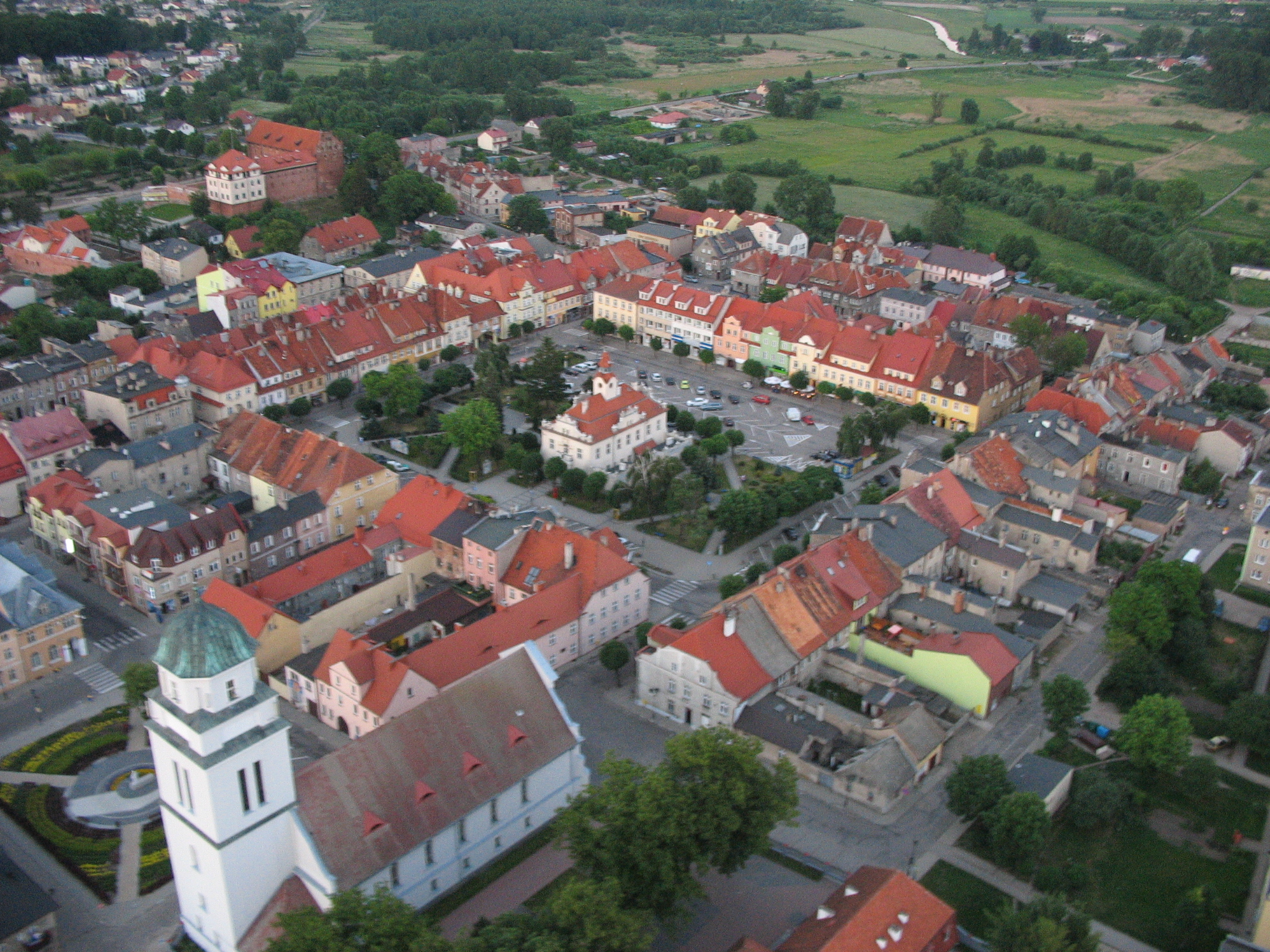
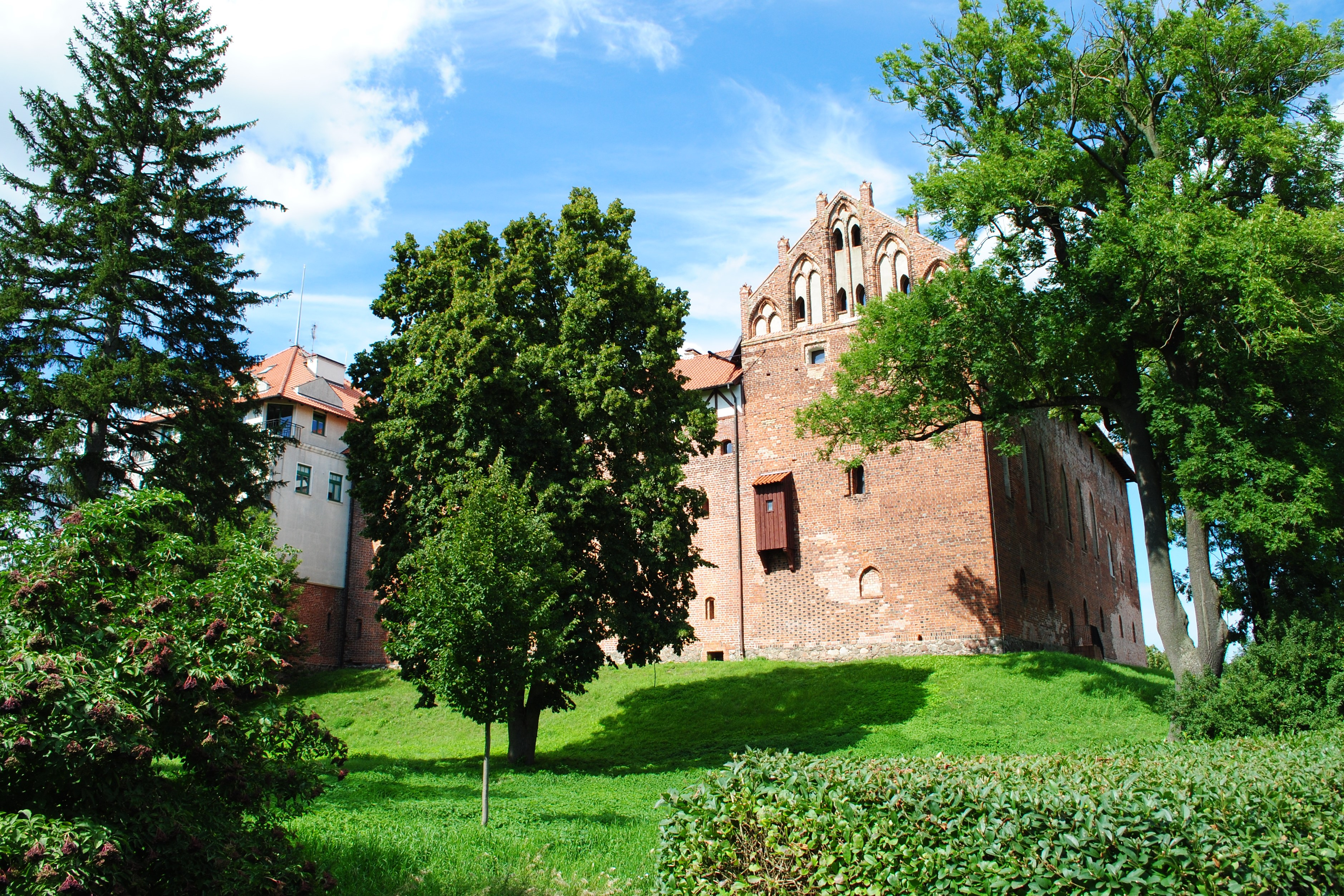
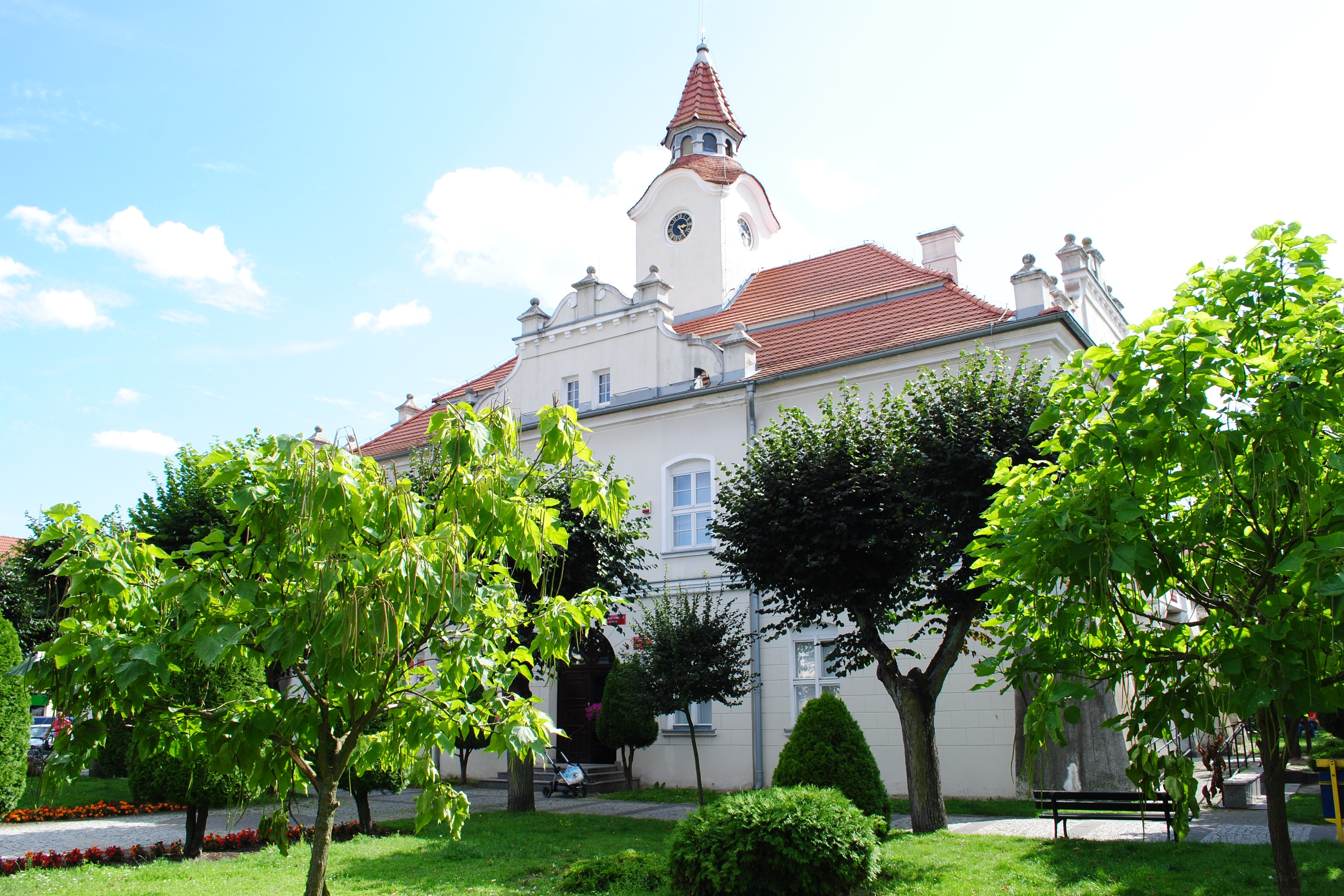
- Aerial view Działdowo Castle Town hall

- Flag Coat of arms

- Location within Poland
- Coordinates: 53°14′N 20°11′E
- Country: Poland
- Voivodeship: Warmian-Masurian
- County: Działdowo
- Gmina: Działdowo (urban gmina)
- Established: 14th century
- Town rights: 1344

Government
  - Mayor: Grzegorz Mrowiński

Area
  - Total: 13.35 km^{2} (5.15 sq mi)

Population (31 December 2021)
  - Total: 20,935
  - Density: 1,568/km^{2} (4,062/sq mi)
- Time zone: UTC+1 (CET)
  - Summer (DST): UTC+2 (CEST)
- Postal code: 13-200
- Area code: +48 23
- Vehicle registration: NDZ
- Website: https://www.dzialdowo.pl

Działdowo (pronounced [d͡ʑau̯ˈdɔvɔ]) (Note: German: Soldau, Prussian: Saldawa) is a town in northern Poland with 20,935 inhabitants as of December 2021, the capital of Działdowo County. As part of Masuria, it is situated in the Warmian-Masurian Voivodeship.

Founded in the Middle Ages and granted town rights in 1344, the town features heritage sites in various styles, including Gothic, Baroque, Gothic Revival and Baroque Revival, a preserved medieval urban layout with a market square and a medieval castle. It is particularly known as the location of the Soldau concentration camp during the German occupation of Poland in World War II. The town is a major railroad junction connecting the capital city of Warsaw with Gdańsk and Olsztyn to the north.

== History ==
The first settlement in the vicinity, known as Sasinowie in Polish and Sassen in German, was established by the Old Prussians, an indigenous Baltic tribe. The Teutonic Knights conquered the region and built a castle, a wing of which still remains. The new settlement near the castle founded by Mikołaj z Karbowa and named Soldov was granted town privileges on 14 August 1344 by the Grand Master Ludolf König. The name Dzialdoff was first written on a 1409 map during the Polish–Lithuanian–Teutonic War.

=== Polish sovereignty ===
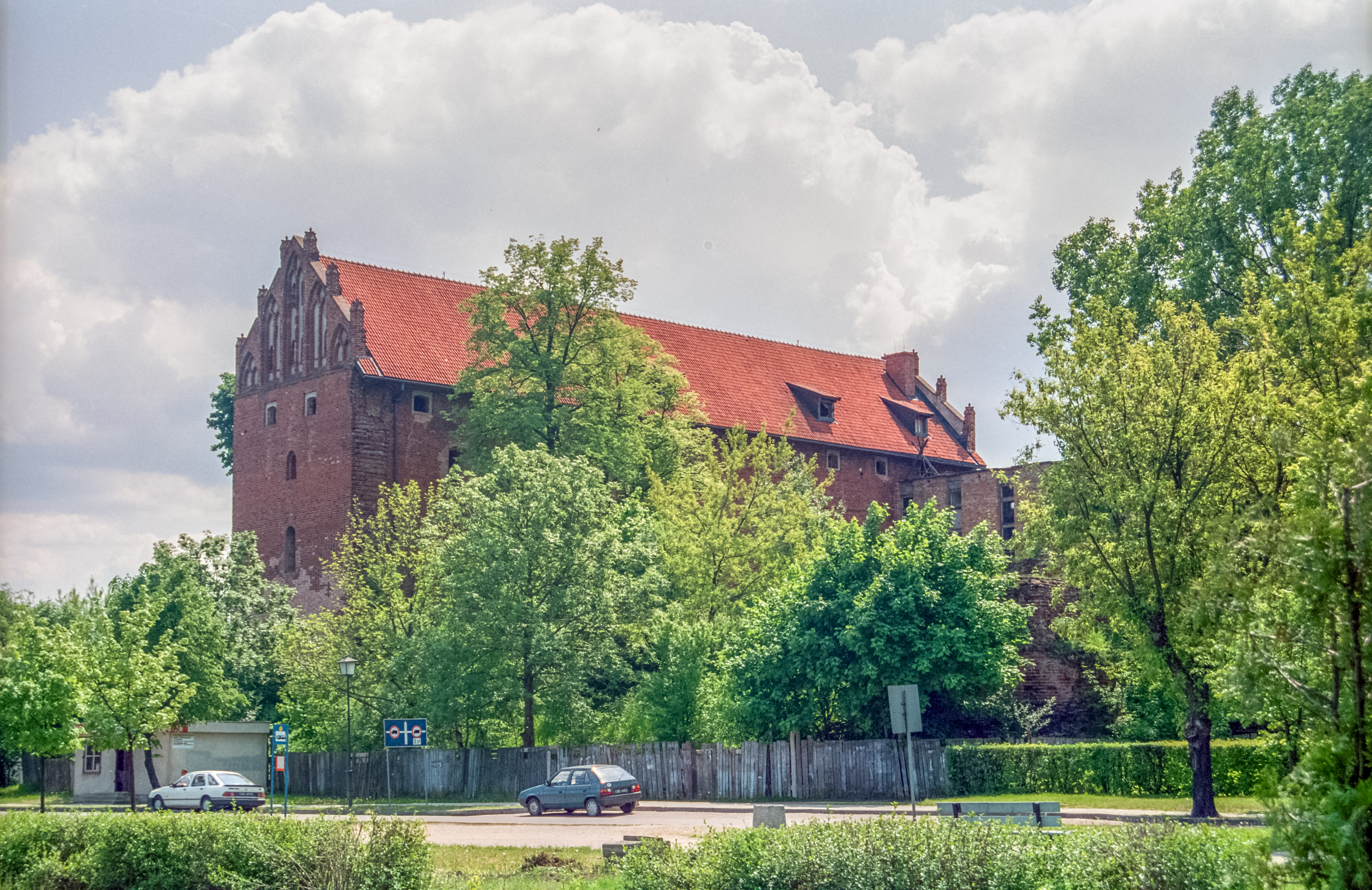
Działdowo Castle

In 1444, the town joined the anti-Teutonic Prussian Confederation, at the request of which King Casimir IV Jagiellon signed the act of incorporation of the region to the Kingdom of Poland in 1454, and then the townspeople expelled the Teutonic Knights and recognized the Polish King as rightful ruler. During the subsequent Thirteen Years' War, the town was briefly captured by the Teutonic Knights in 1455. After the peace treaty signed in Toruń in 1466, it became a part of Poland as a fief held by the State of the Teutonic Knights.

Within the Duchy of Prussia (a Polish fiefdom until 1657), the settlement converted to Lutheranism during the Protestant Reformation of the 16th century. The following communes belonged to the Protestant parish of Działdowo: Borowo, Bursz, Gajówki, Kisiny, Komorniki, Księży Dwór, Kurki, Malinowo, Pierławki, Prusinowo, Rudolfowo, Wysoka, and Zakrzewo.

=== Kingdom of Prussia and Germany ===
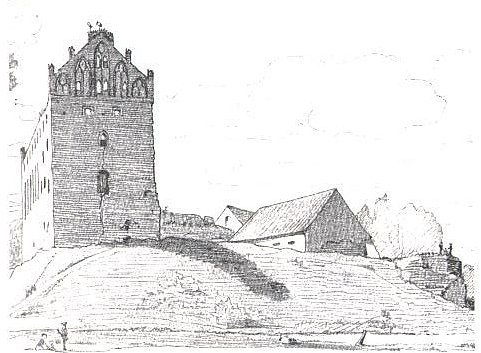
The castle in the 19th century

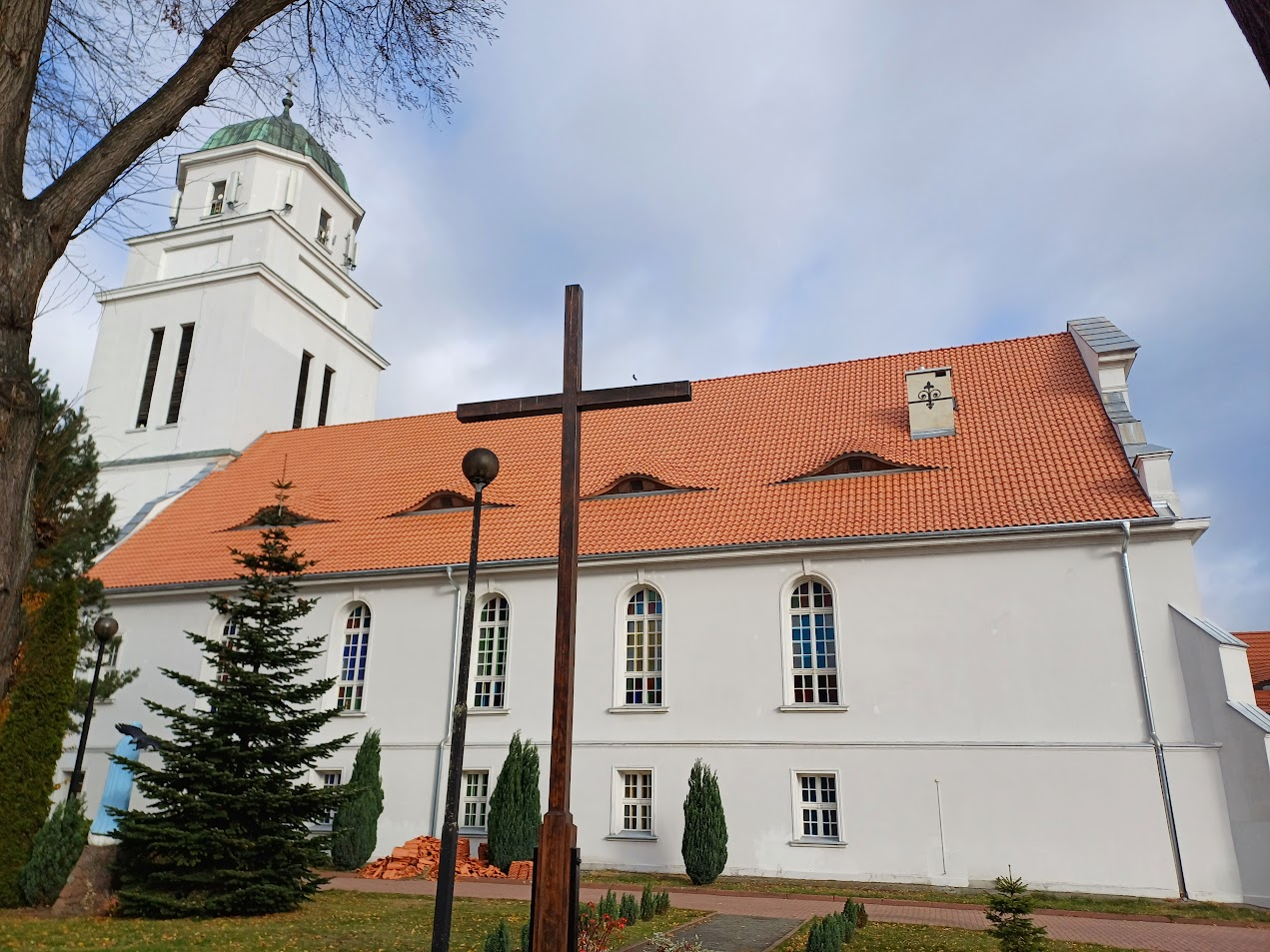
Exaltation of the Holy Cross church

In 1701, the town became part of the Kingdom of Prussia, from 1773 on within the newly formed province of East Prussia. Within the Kingdom of Prussia and the later German Empire, the settlement developed into an important Prussian Eastern Railway junction in the second half of the 19th century.

The town had a Polish majority in 1825, with 1,496 Poles and 386 Germans living within it. At the same time, the Prussian authorities were hostile to the local population due to its Polish pro-independence activity during the November and January Uprisings in Congress Poland. During the January Uprising of 1863 an ammunition depot and contact point was secretly established by local people trying to help their fellow Poles in the struggle against the Russian Empire; it was located at the house of Doctor Russendorf. Prussian authorities arrested several locals and harassed the local population which tried to form military units to aid the uprising. The area remained Polish despite attempts at Germanisation. In 1815, 79% of the local population were Poles, and only 21% Germans. In 1837, 74% were Poles and 26% Germans. In the second half of the 19th century, 87% of the district's population were Poles. With the increase of Germanisation efforts in 1910, the whole district population was divided among 57% Poles, 42% Germans and 1% Jews according to official German statistics. In 1910, the town itself had 4,728 inhabitants, 3,589 of them Germans. In 1912, the Germans introduced the terms "Masurs" and "Masurian language" instead of "Poles" and "Polish language" in the census in the area. It was part of the Landkreis Neidenburg district in East Prussia, and it was the southernmost town in the province.

The town was fought over in the early stages of World War I. It was briefly occupied by Russian troops and won back by the Germans during the Battle of Tannenberg. The occupation of Soldau is described in Aleksandr Solzhenitsyn's novel August 1914.

=== Interwar Poland ===
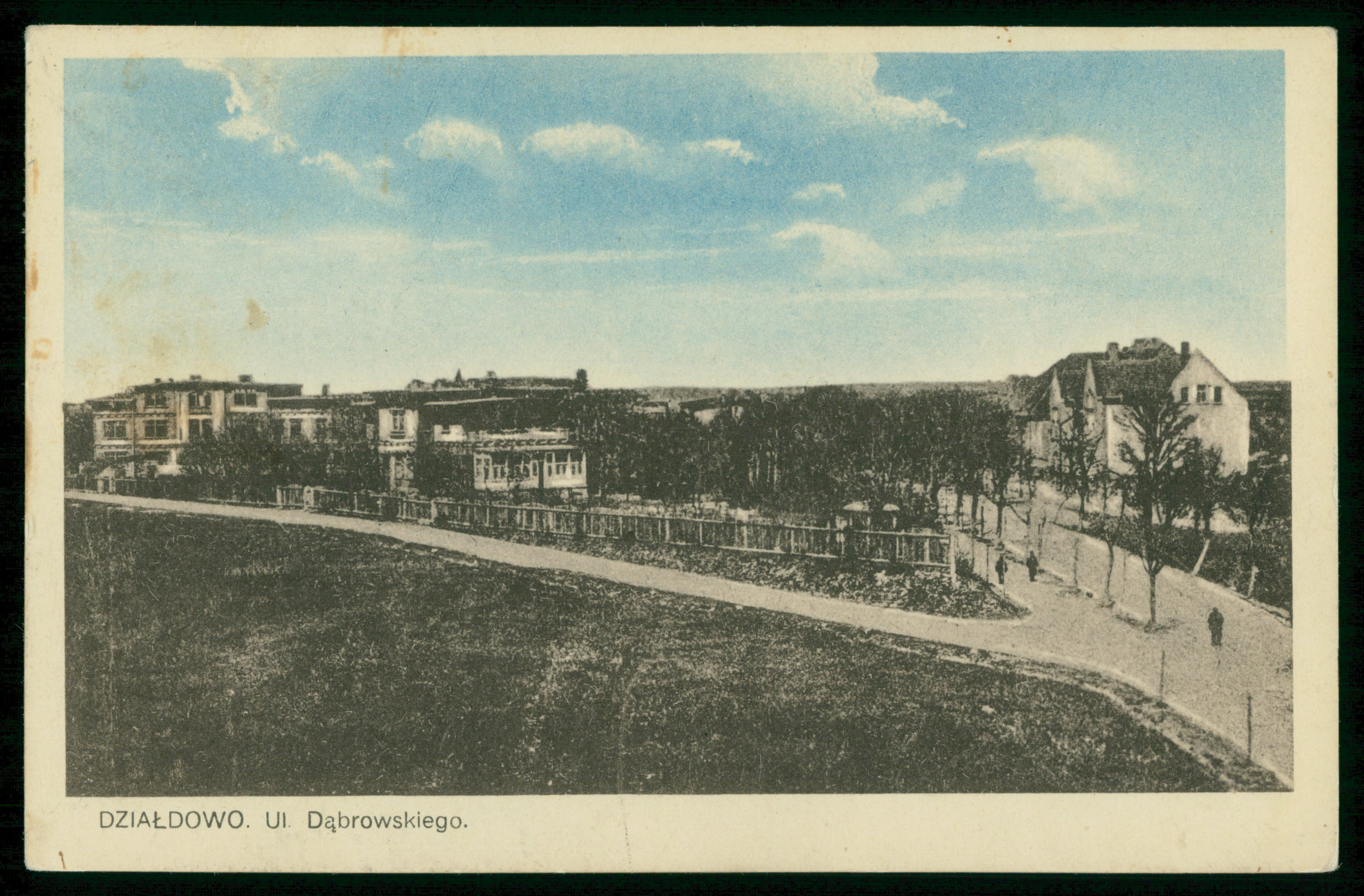
Postcard from 1928

Despite the attempts of the local German populace and authorities and the German Government, the town together with neighboring settlements was transferred to reborn Poland on 17 January 1920 by the Treaty of Versailles for geostrategic reasons without participating in the East Prussian plebiscite(for the train line from the port to the capital). The Prussian Eastern Railway connection to German Prussia such as Deutsch Eylau (Iława), Osterode (Ostróda), and Neidenburg (Nidzica) in East Prussia were severed after the border changes. After the town was ceded to Poland, a large number of the German inhabitants left, including not only German-speakers, but, at roughly the same percentage, Polish-speakers, despite Polish campaigns to win them over as Polish nationals.

The candidate of the German Party, Ernst Barczewski, was elected to the Sejm with 74.6% of votes in 1920, and to the Polish Senate with 34.6% of votes for the Bloc of National Minorities in 1928. In 1921, the Polish census gave the following data regarding the ethnic composition of the whole district: Poles, 15,496; Germans, 8,187; others, 44.

During the Polish-Soviet War, Działdowo was briefly occupied by the Red Army, which was cheered as a liberator by the local German populace, with the Red Army hoisting the German flag again. However, the city was soon recovered by the Polish Army.

The city became a part of the Warsaw Voivodeship in 1938 after being a part of the Pomeranian Voivodeship for 19 years.

=== World War II ===
During the German–Soviet invasion of Poland in 1939 that began World War II, the town was invaded by Germany, and then the Einsatzgruppe V entered to commit crimes against the Polish population. Under German occupation, the town was annexed back into the Neidenburg District by Nazi Germany. The German minority in the town formed the Selbstschutz death squad that captured and tortured Polish leaders and members of the political and cultural elites before murdering them. Only some of the local Polish activists were caught by the Germans, as most fled and hid under assumed names in the General Government (German-occupied central Poland).

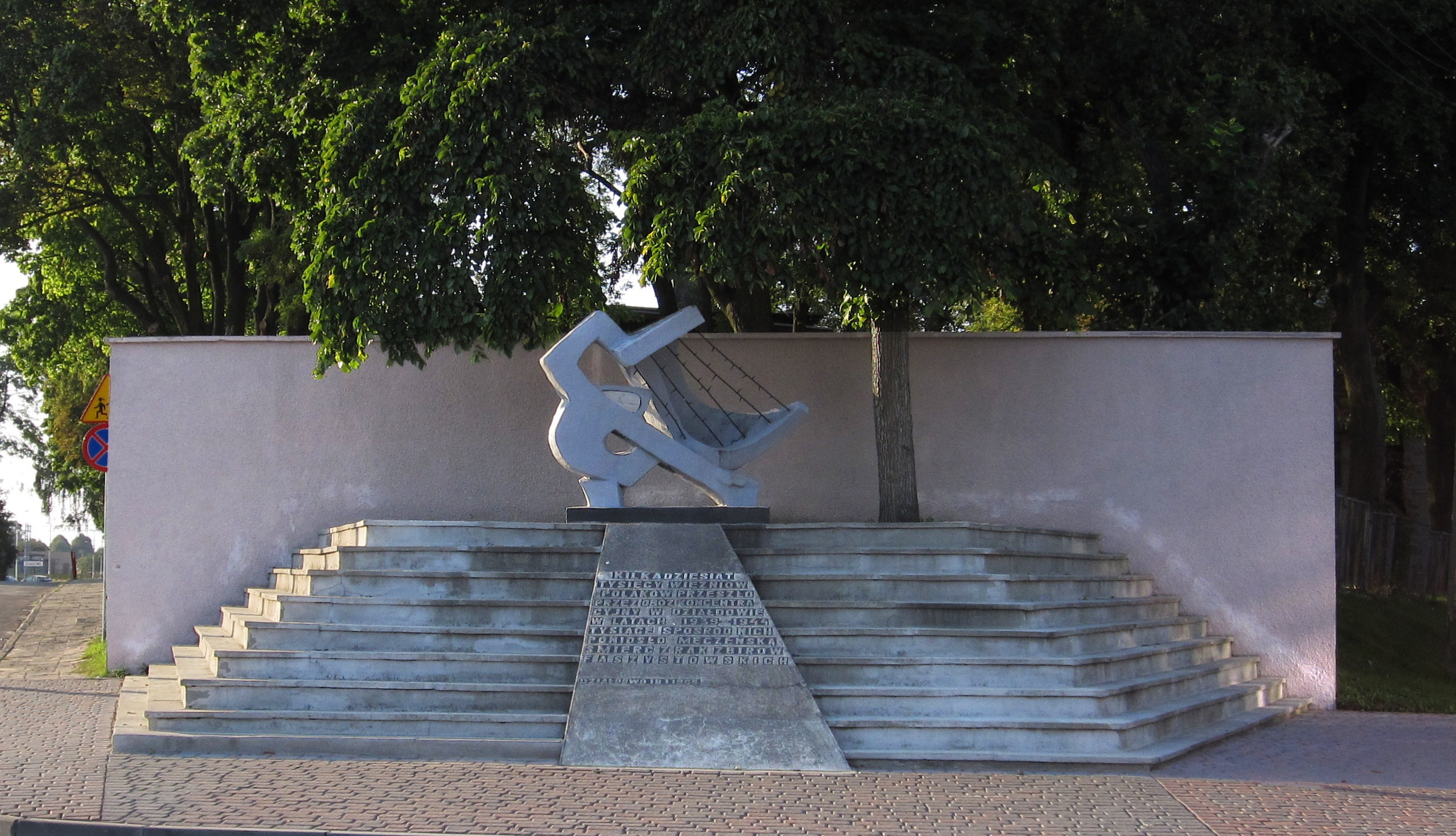
Monument to victims of the German Nazi Soldau concentration camp

In 1939, the occupiers established the Dulag Soldau prisoner-of-war camp for captured Polish soldiers at the pre-war Polish military barracks. In December 1939 it was converted into a camp for Polish civilians arrested during the Intelligenzaktion, which later became the Soldau concentration camp, at which 10,000–13,000 prisoners out of 30,000 were murdered. The first mass transport of Polish prisoners came to the camp from the nearby Ciechanów County in December 1939, and those were the victims of the first mass execution in the camp. The Germans also operated two forced labour camps in the town. Several Poles, who were either born, educated or lived and worked in Działdowo, including the local police chief and former deputy chief, were murdered by the Russians in the Katyn massacre in 1940. In 1943 in Warsaw, activists from Działdowo established the secret Masurian Research Institute (Mazurski Instytut Badawczy), which was part of the Polish Secret Teaching Organization.

The town was heavily damaged during the fighting on the Eastern Front. The Soviet NKVD operated an assembly point for captured Polish resistance members in the town, who were then deported to Siberia. The Poles either returned to Poland later on, or died in Soviet captivity. It was then restored to Poland.

=== Present day ===
The city became a part of the Warsaw Voivodeship in 1945, a part of Olsztyn Voivodeship in 1950, a part of Ciechanów Voivodeship in 1975 and a part of Warmian-Masurian Voivodeship in 1999.

== Transport ==
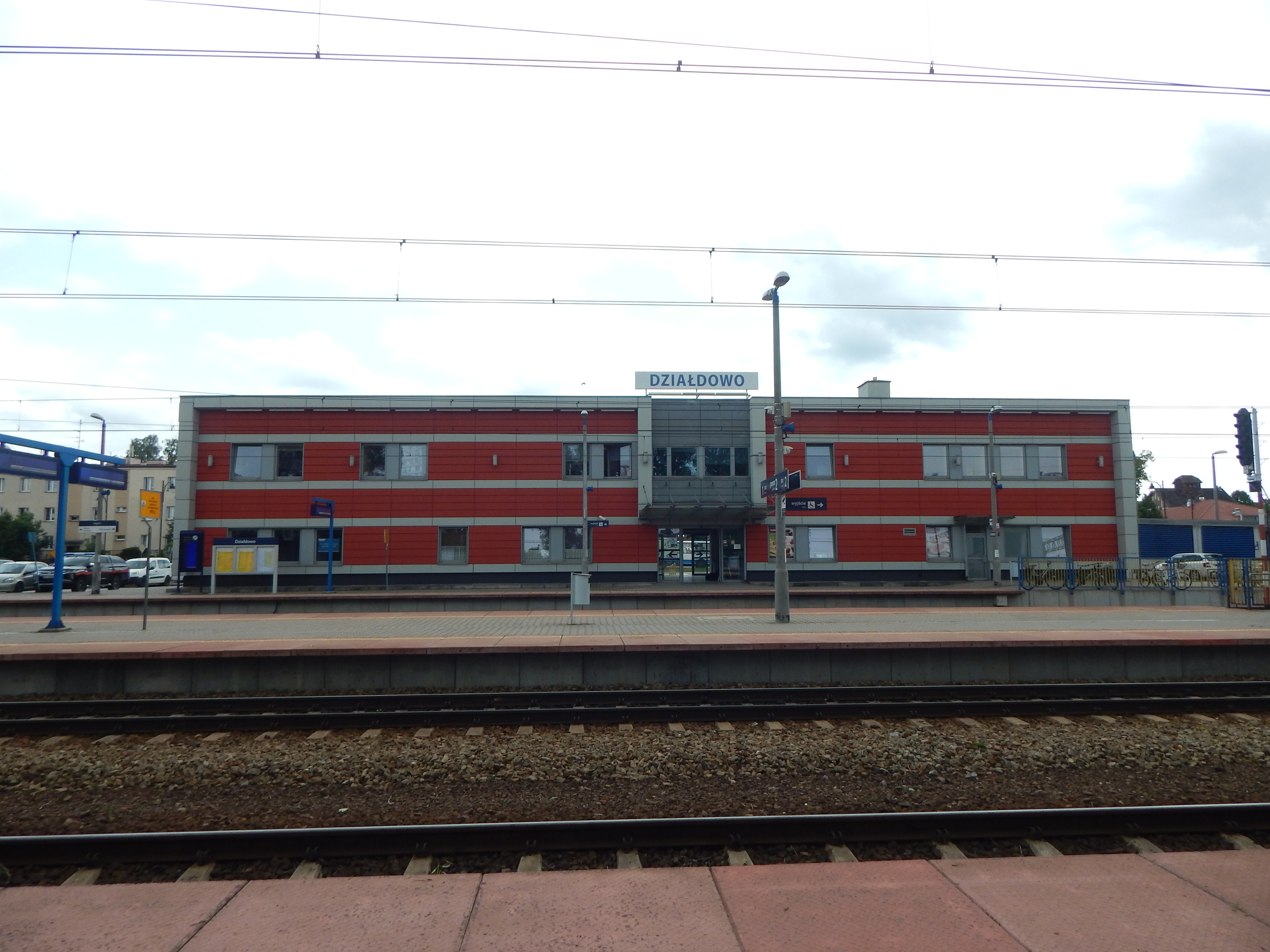
Railway station

The town is located at the intersection of the Voivodeship roads 542, 544, 545. There is also a train station on the Gdańsk-Warsaw line, with daily connections to Gdańsk, Warsaw and Olsztyn.

== Notable residents ==
- Kasia Stankiewicz (born 1977), singer
- Nina Patalon (born 1986), Polish footballer and manager
- Mateusz Sobotka (born 2004), footballer

== International relations ==
Działdowo is twinned with:

- Hersfeld-Rotenburg, Germany
- Truskavets, Ukraine
