= Niederhof =

Niederhof may refer to:

- Dolní Dvůr or Niederhof, a village and municipality in Trutnov District, Czech Republic
- Księży Dwór, Działdowo County or Niederhof, a village in Gmina Działdowo, Poland
- Mokronos Dolny or Niederhof, a village Gmina Kąty Wrocławskie, Poland
- Niederhof, a community or hamlet of Bruck an der Großglocknerstraße, Austria
- Niederhof, a suburb, hamlet, or other subdivision in Sankt Georgen im Lavanttal, Wolfsberg District, Austria
- Niederhof, a village in Wiehl, Germany
- Niederhof, a district of Waldbröl, Germany
- Niederhof, a commune of the former Evangelical parish Działdowo, Poland
- Niederhof, a German exonym for Bas-Hoste, Moselle, France
