= Gąsiorowo =

Gąsiorowo may refer to the following places:

- Gąsiorowo, Kuyavian-Pomeranian Voivodeship (north-central Poland)
- Gąsiorowo, Legionowo County in Masovian Voivodeship (east-central Poland)
- Gąsiorowo, Gmina Zaręby Kościelne, Ostrów County in Masovian Voivodeship (east-central Poland)
- Gąsiorowo, Pułtusk County in Masovian Voivodeship (east-central Poland)
- Gąsiorowo, Greater Poland Voivodeship (west-central Poland)
- Gąsiorowo, Działdowo County in Warmian-Masurian Voivodeship (north Poland)
- Gąsiorowo, Olecko County in Warmian-Masurian Voivodeship (north Poland)
- Gąsiorowo, Olsztyn County in Warmian-Masurian Voivodeship (north Poland)
