= Wilamowo =

Wilamowo may refer to the following places:

- Wilamowo, Kuyavian-Pomeranian Voivodeship (north-central Poland)
- Wilamowo, Podlaskie Voivodeship (north-east Poland)
- Wilamowo, Działdowo County in Warmian-Masurian Voivodeship (north Poland)
- Wilamowo, Kętrzyn County in Warmian-Masurian Voivodeship (north Poland)
- Wilamowo, Ostróda County in Warmian-Masurian Voivodeship (north Poland)
- Wilamowo, Szczytno County in Warmian-Masurian Voivodeship (north Poland)
