= Starczanowo =

Starczanowo may refer to:

- Starczanowo, Poznań County, Poland
- Starczanowo, Września County, Poland
