= Kramarzewo =

Kramarzewo may refer to the following places:

- Kramarzewo, Podlaskie Voivodeship (north-east Poland)
- Kramarzewo, Działdowo County in Warmian-Masurian Voivodeship (north Poland)
- Kramarzewo, Olsztyn County in Warmian-Masurian Voivodeship (north Poland)
