= Gmina Działdowo =

Gmina Działdowo Działdowo Commune
- Gmina
- Interactive map of Gmina Działdowo
- Coordinates (Działdowo): 53°14′N 20°11′E
- Country: Poland
- Voivodeship: Warmian-Masurian
- County: Działdowo
- Seat: Działdowo

Area
  - Total: 272.77 km^{2} (105.32 sq mi)

Population (2011)
  - Total: 9,777
  - Density: 35.84/km^{2} (92.83/sq mi)
- Website: http://www.gminadzialdowo.pl

Gmina Działdowo is a rural gmina (administrative district) in Działdowo County, Warmian-Masurian Voivodeship, in northern Poland. Its seat is the town of Działdowo, although the town is not part of the territory of the gmina.

The gmina covers an area of 272.77 square kilometres (105.3 sq mi), and as of 2006 its total population is 9,481 (9,777 in 2011).

== Villages ==
Gmina Działdowo contains the villages and settlements of Burkat, Bursz, Drzazgi, Filice, Gąsiorowo, Gnojenko, Gnojno, Grzybiny, Jankowice, Kisiny, Klęczkowo, Komorniki, Kramarzewo, Krasnołąka, Księży Dwór, Kurki, Lipówka, Malinowo, Mosznica, Myślęta, Niestoja, Petrykozy, Pierławki, Pożary, Prusinowo, Rudolfowo, Ruszkowo, Rywociny, Sękowo, Sławkowo, Turza Wielka, Uzdowo, Wilamowo, Wysoka and Zakrzewo.

== Neighbouring gminas ==
Gmina Działdowo is bordered by the gminas of Dąbrówno, Iłowo-Osada, Kozłowo, Kuczbork-Osada, Lipowiec Kościelny, Płośnica and Rybno.
