= Sławkowo =

Sławkowo may refer to the following places:

- Sławkowo, Kuyavian-Pomeranian Voivodeship (north-central Poland)
- Sławkowo, Maków County in Masovian Voivodeship (east-central Poland)
- Sławkowo, Mława County in Masovian Voivodeship (east-central Poland)
- Sławkowo, Działdowo County in Warmian-Masurian Voivodeship (north Poland)
- Sławkowo, Kętrzyn County in Warmian-Masurian Voivodeship (north Poland)
- Sławkowo, West Pomeranian Voivodeship (north-west Poland)
