= Mystki Palace =

- Pałac w Mystkach
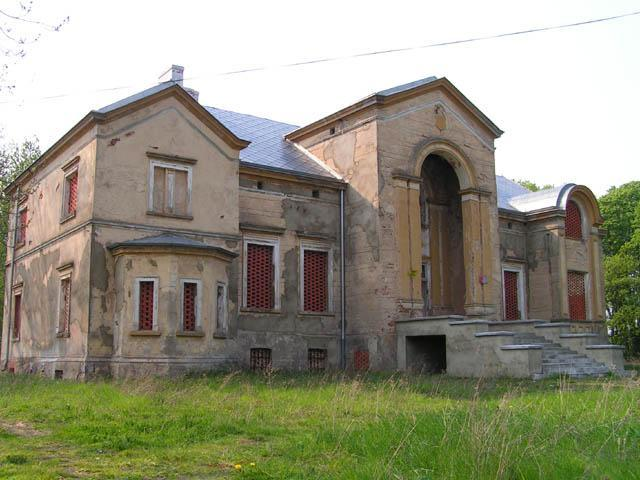

- Location within Poland

General information
- Type: Palace
- Architectural style: Renaissance
- Location: Mystki, Poland
- Coordinates: 52°16′42″N 17°26′25″E
- Completed: 1696
- Owner: Karol Karśnicki

Technical details
- Floor count: 2

Design and construction
- Architect: Stanisław Hebanowski

Mystki Palace - built in the 1880s probably design by Stanisław Hebanowski. Mansion-villa built in the French Renaissance style with a large bay on the axis of the input. Indoor hip roof. The main part of the building is the ground floor. Very run-down mansion, on the verge of ruin.

Before building the palace, Charles Karśnicki Mystki owner and the host of the court at the same time tried to keep in touch with artists, writers. Louis Gomolec in his work on średzki Earth wrote: "secluded lounges, an old Polish manor house in Mystki were open for poets and writers. In Mystki lived poet and writer Lucian Siemienski (1807–1877) and Józef Ignacy Kraszewski (1812–1877). Thrice (1862.1865, 1867) guest in Mystki was the Tekla half-brother, also Arrigo Boito, one of the leading European composers of opera librettos and authors of the second half of the nineteenth and early twentieth centuries. After Charles's death (November 11, 1870), thanks to the efforts of his wife Tekla in 1877 a new mansion was built in the French Renaissance style, designed by the architect Stanislaw Hebanowski. After Tekla Karśnicka death in 1885 passed Mystki into the hands of Karłowskis family who farmed here until 1939. After the war, the property belonged to the State Farms. Currently mansion with a park administered by the ARWSP (Agricultural Property Agency of the State Treasury) and waiting for a new buyer who would restore his former glory.

== Sources ==
- Libicki, Marcin; Libicki, Piotr (2003). Dwory i pałace wiejskie w Wielkopolsce (in Polish). Rebis Dom Wydawniczy. ISBN 978-83-7301-243-1.
