= Drzazgi =

Drzazgi may refer to:

- Drzazgi, Działdowo County, village in Poland
- Drzazgi, Olsztyn County, village in Poland
