= Stroszki =

- Village
- Location within Poland
- Coordinates: 52°20′44″N 17°23′29″E
- Country: Poland
- Voivodeship: Greater Poland
- County: Września
- Gmina: Nekla

Stroszki [ˈstrɔʂki] is a village in the administrative district of Gmina Nekla, within Września County, Greater Poland Voivodeship, in west-central Poland.
