= Gierłatowo =

- Village
- Location within Poland
- Coordinates: 52°21′N 17°26′E
- Country: Poland
- Voivodeship: Greater Poland
- County: Września
- Gmina: Nekla

Gierłatowo [ɡʲɛrwaˈtɔvɔ] is a village in the administrative district of Gmina Nekla, within Września County, Greater Poland Voivodeship, in west-central Poland.
