= Gnojno, Warmian-Masurian Voivodeship =

Gnojno
- Village
- Location within Poland
- Coordinates: 53°10′N 20°6′E
- Country: Poland
- Voivodeship: Warmian-Masurian
- County: Działdowo
- Gmina: Działdowo
- Population: 276

Gnojno [ˈɡnɔi̯nɔ] is a village in the administrative district of Gmina Działdowo, within Działdowo County, Warmian-Masurian Voivodeship, in northern Poland.
