= Barczyzna =

- Village
- Location within Poland
- Coordinates: 52°23′N 17°27′E
- Country: Poland
- Voivodeship: Greater Poland
- County: Września
- Gmina: Nekla
- Population: 110

Barczyzna [barˈt͡ʂɨzna] is a village in the administrative district of Gmina Nekla, within Września County, Greater Poland Voivodeship, in west-central Poland.
