= Rajmundowo, Greater Poland Voivodeship =

Rajmundowo
- Settlement
- Location within Poland
- Coordinates: 52°23′02″N 17°24′44″E
- Country: Poland
- Voivodeship: Greater Poland
- County: Września
- Gmina: Nekla

Rajmundowo [rai̯munˈdɔvɔ] is a settlement in the administrative district of Gmina Nekla, within Września County, Greater Poland Voivodeship, in west-central Poland.
