= Podstolice Manor House =

Manor house in Podstolice
- Dwór w Podstolicach
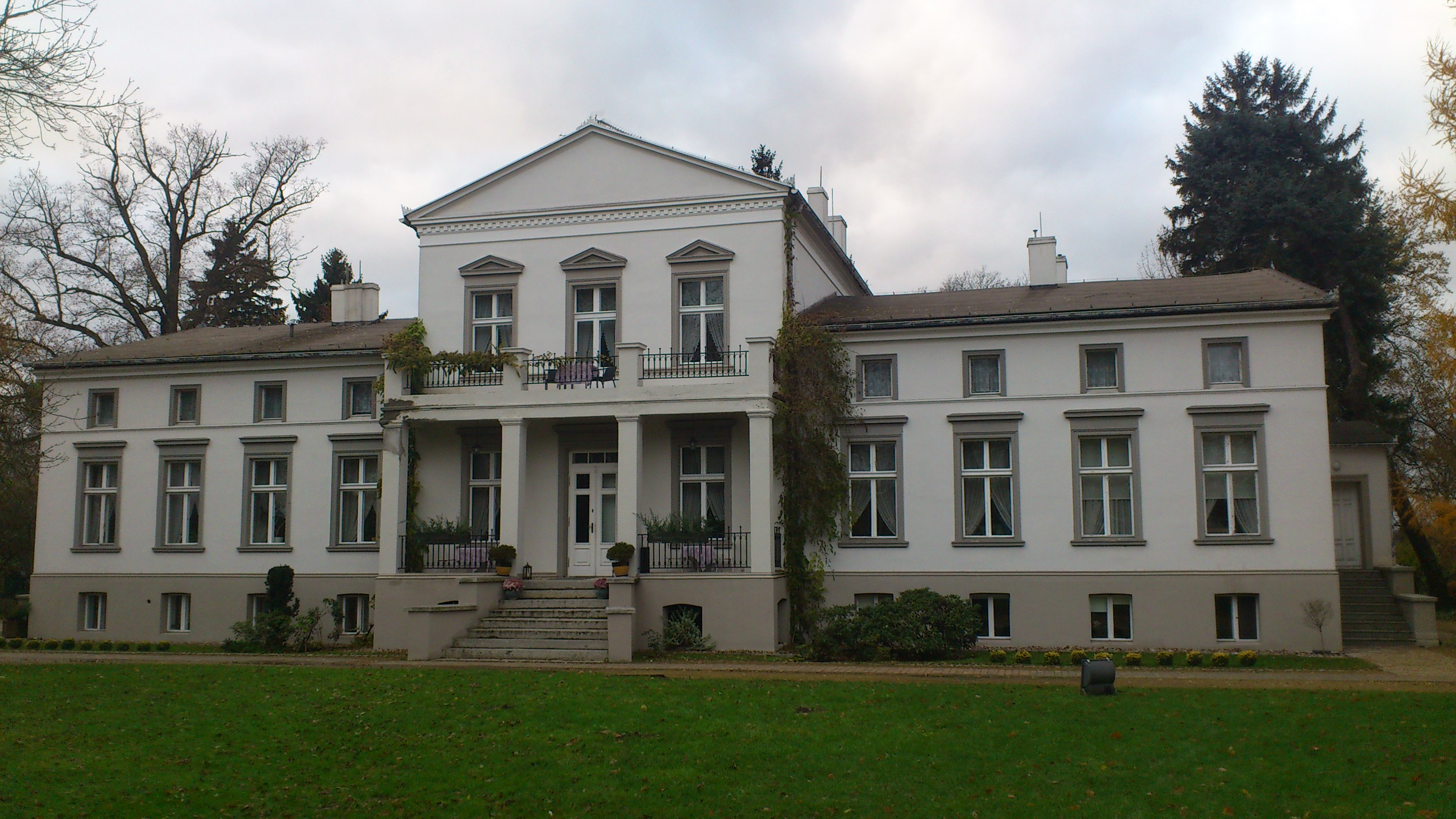

- Location within Poland

General information
- Type: Manor house
- Architectural style: Neoclassicism
- Location: Podstolice, Września County, Poland, Poland
- Coordinates: 52°19′47.75″N 17°28′4.60″E
- Construction started: about 1890
- Client: count Hedogron Kierski
- Owner: Mrs and Mr Kareński

Technical details
- Floor area: 1200 m²

Manor house in Podstolice back

Manor house in Podstolice (Polish: Dwór w Podstolicach) - historic manor house in Podstolice, in Września Country, in Greater Poland.

== Description ==
This is a manor house of wooden construction from 1890, it has a basement and two floors. The building of 1200 m^{2} is surrounded by a hundred-year-old park with a pond.

== History ==
The history of the manor house goes back to the nineteenth century, when the owner of Podstolice village was count Hedogron Kierski. He started the construction of a neoclassical building in 1890. In 1920 the owner of Podstolice was Baron Stronbetzky. In the interwar period it became the property of the Polish State Treasury and its tenant was Stanisław Karłowski. Over the period of the Second World War the estate was managed by trustee (Treuhänder) Neubert. After the war it was under the management of Podstolice Provincial Land Office, and the area of the manor was managed in the 1950 by Agricultural Cooperative. Since 1992, the owners of the manor have been Mrs and Mr Kareński from Poznań.

== Gallery ==
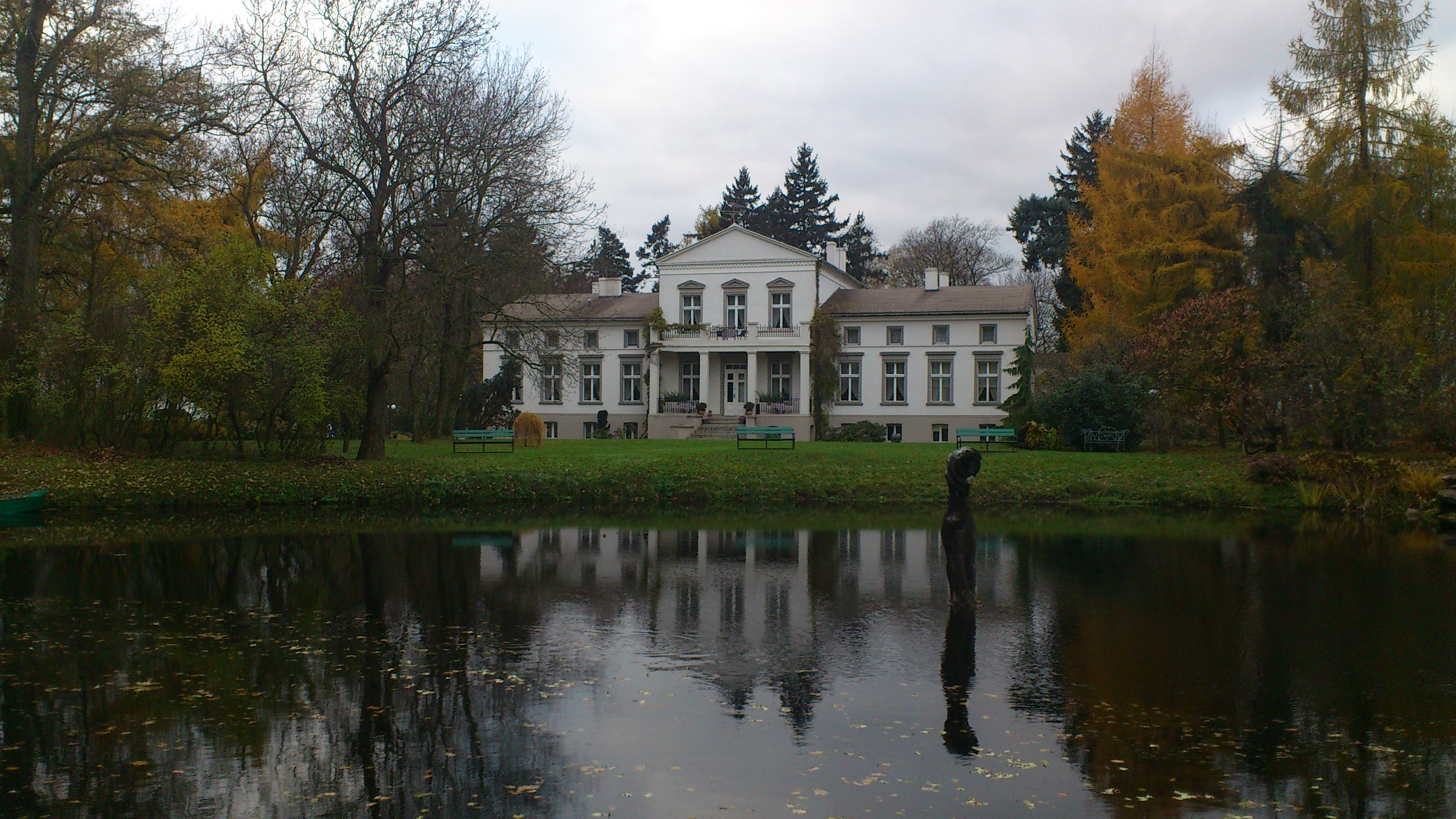
From afar

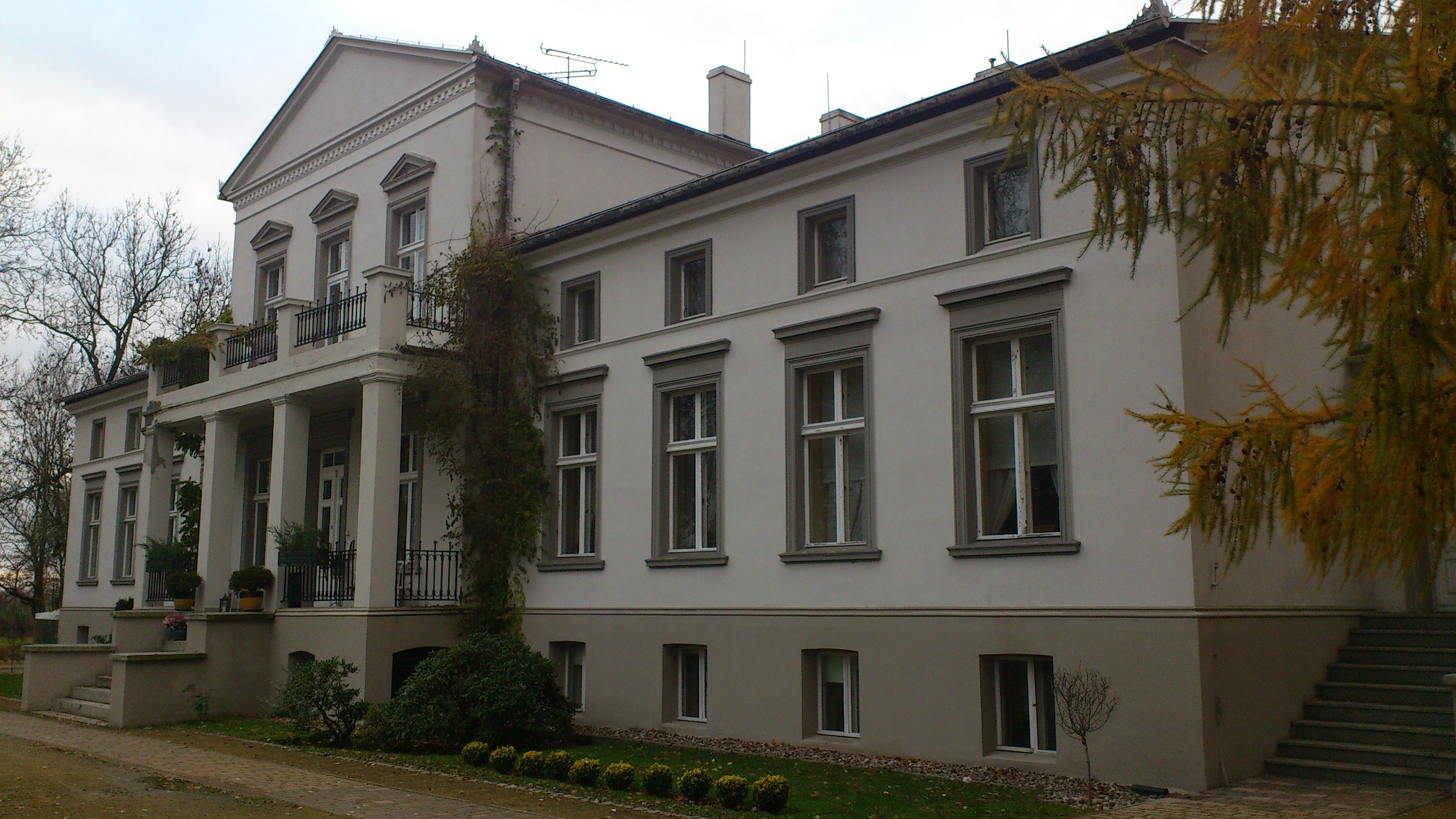
Front

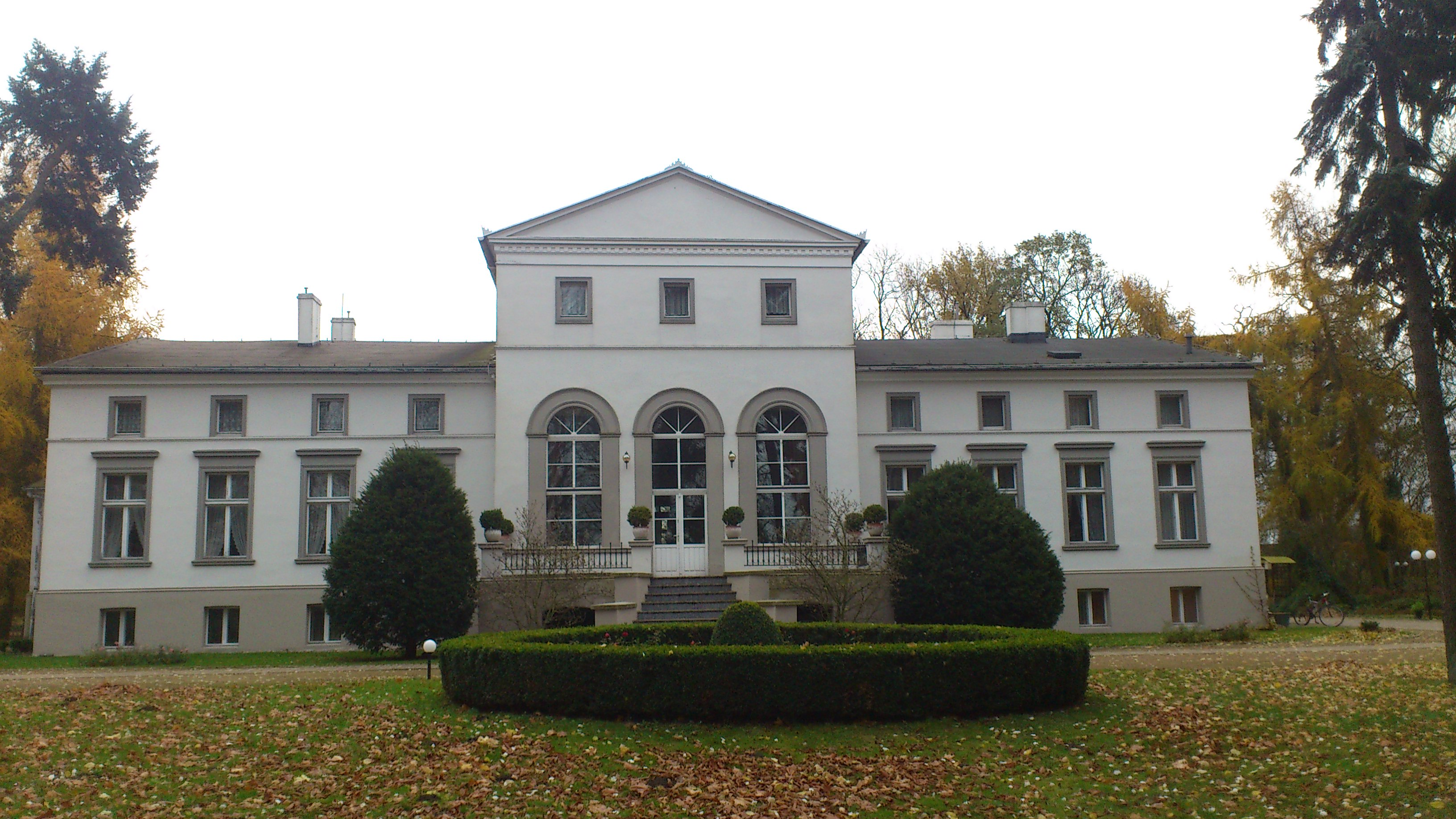
Rear

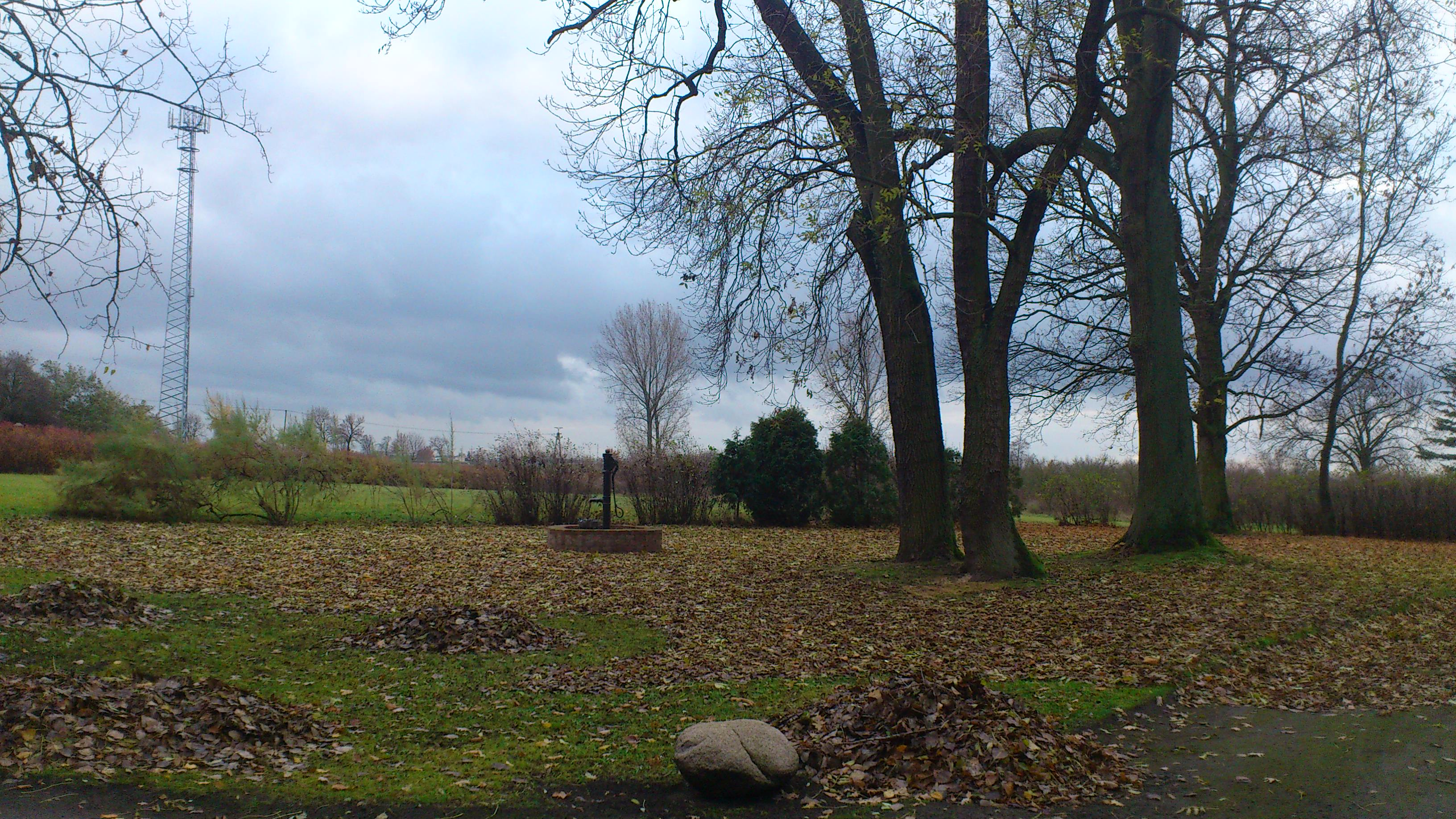
Park at the manor house

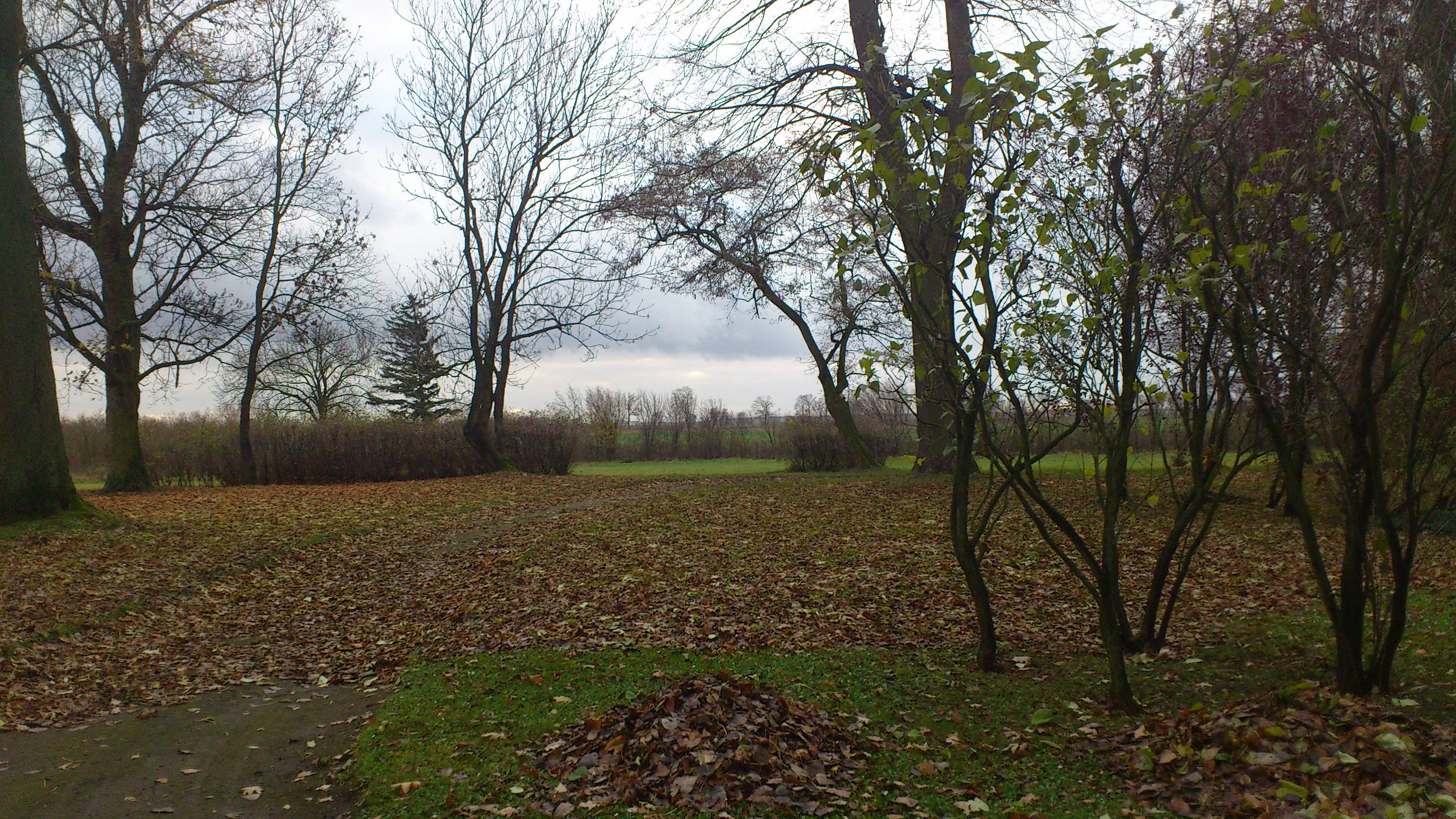
South park

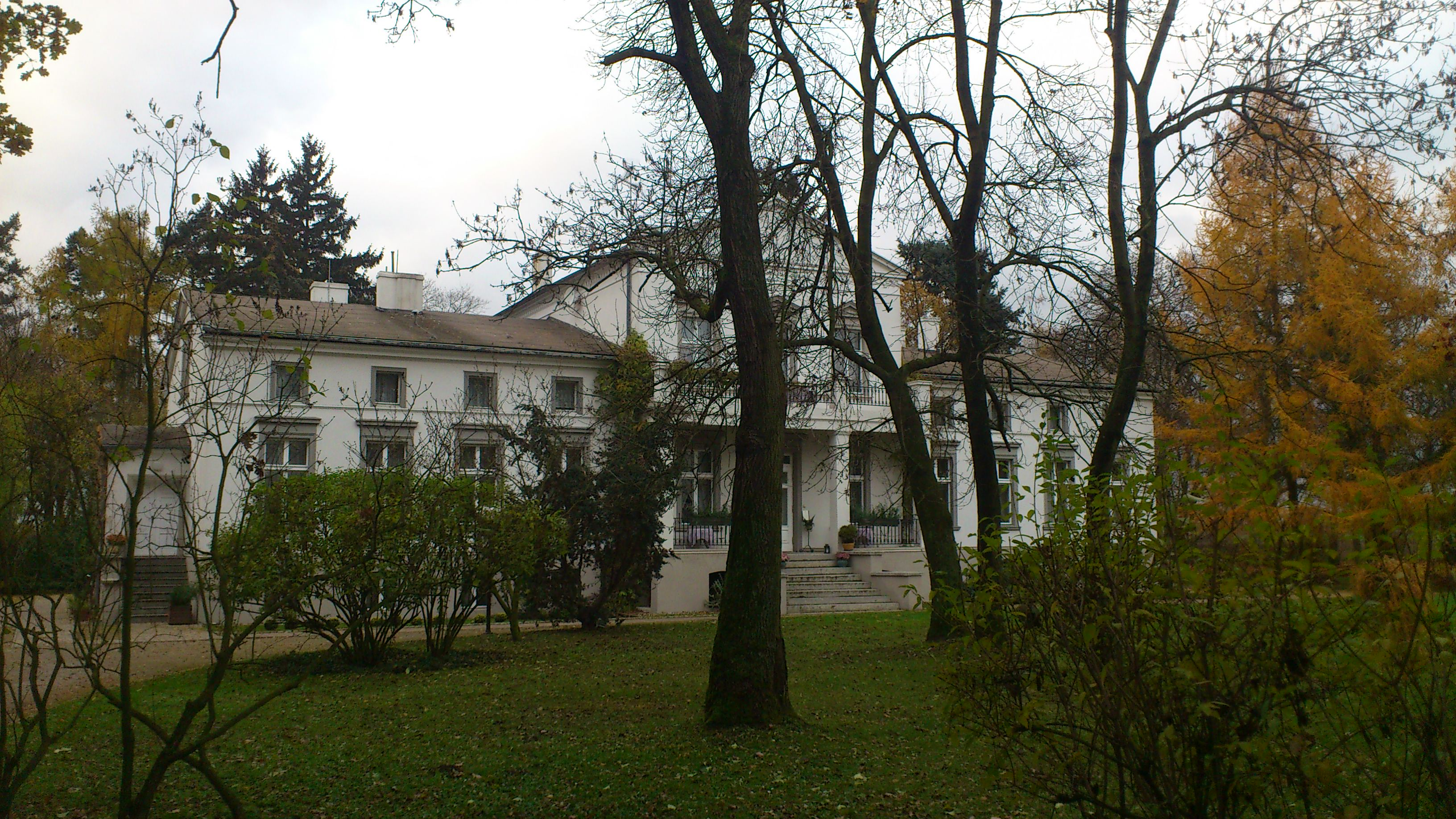
East park

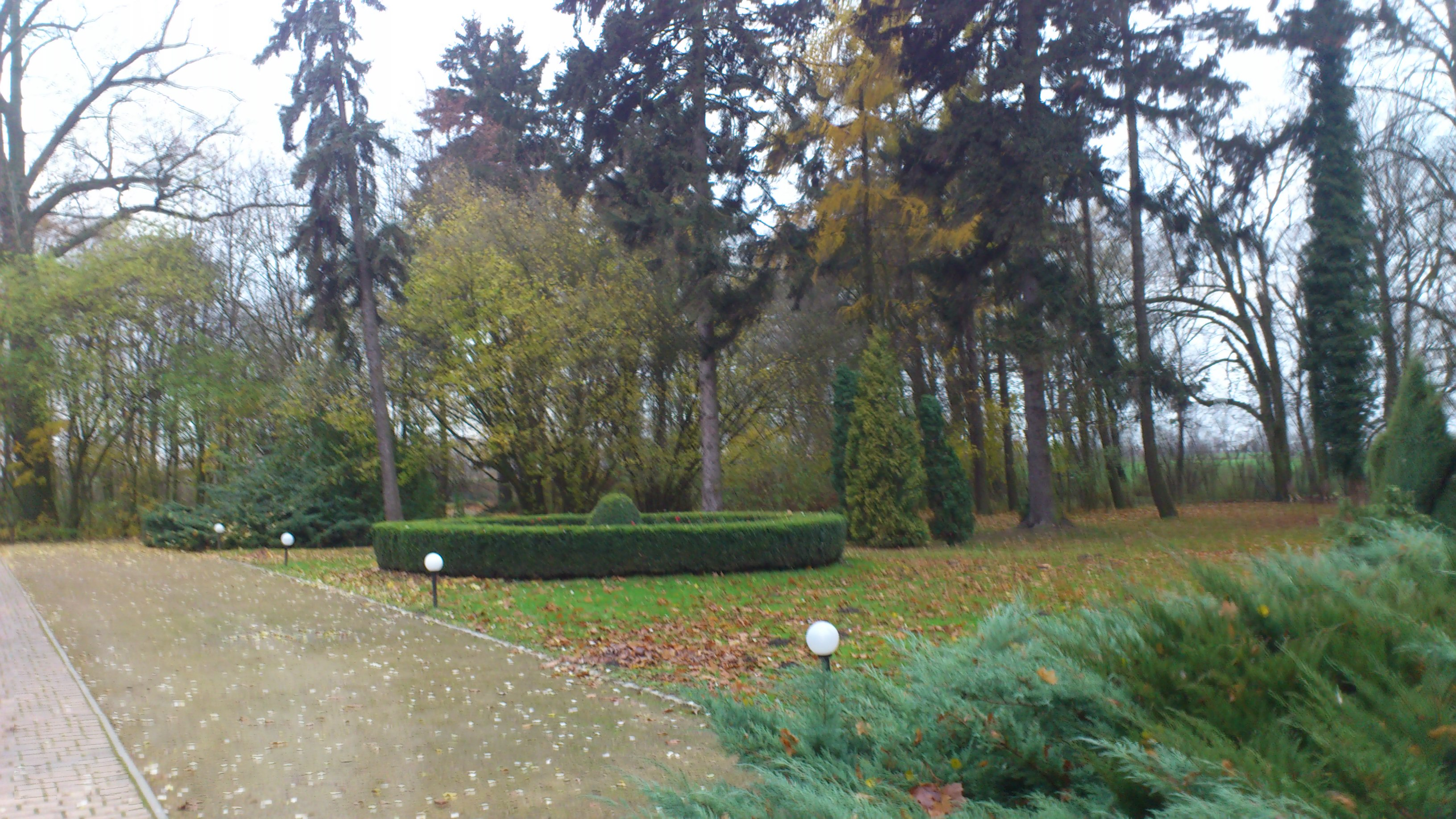
West park

3D view

== Sources ==
1. Manor house in Podstolice (in Polish), podstolice.pl, archived from the original on 15 January 2013.
2. Szlak zamków, pałaców i dworów w Wielkopolsce (PDF) (in Polish), Poznań: Wielkopolska Organizacja Turystyczna, 2012, ISBN 978-83-61454-51-9.
