= Targowa Górka =

- Village
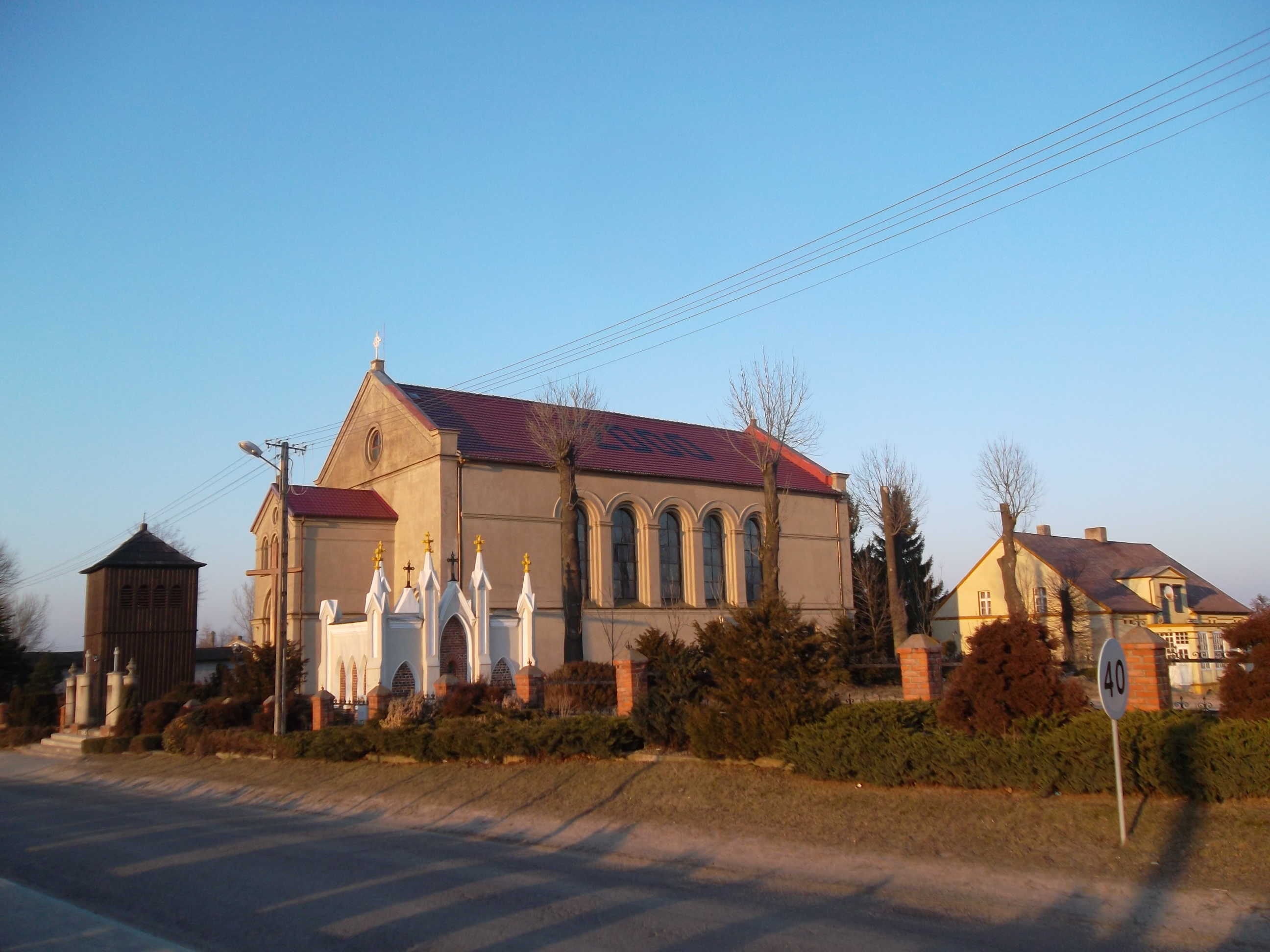

- Location within Poland
- Coordinates: 52°18′15″N 17°26′39″E
- Country: Poland
- Voivodeship: Greater Poland
- County: Września
- Gmina: Nekla
- Population: 540

Targowa Górka [tarˈɡɔva ˈɡurka] is a village in the administrative district of Gmina Nekla, within Września County, Greater Poland Voivodeship, in west-central Poland.
