= Gmina Nekla =

Gmina Nekla Nekla Commune
- Gmina
- Coat of arms
- Interactive map of Gmina Nekla
- Coordinates (Nekla): 52°22′N 17°25′E
- Country: Poland
- Voivodeship: Greater Poland
- County: Września
- Seat: Nekla

Area
  - Total: 96.24 km^{2} (37.16 sq mi)

Population (2006)
  - Total: 6,623
  - Density: 68.82/km^{2} (178.2/sq mi)
  - Urban: 3,203
  - Rural: 3,420
- Website: http://www.nekla.pl/

Gmina Nekla is an urban-rural gmina (administrative district) in Września County, Greater Poland Voivodeship, in west-central Poland. Its seat is the town of Nekla, which lies approximately 12 kilometres (7 mi) west of Września and 35 km (22 mi) east of the regional capital Poznań.

The gmina covers an area of 96.24 square kilometres (37.2 sq mi). As of 2006, its total population is 6,623; out of which, the population of Nekla amounts to 3,203, and the population of the rural part of the gmina is 3,420.

== Villages ==
Apart from the town of Nekla, Gmina Nekla contains the villages and settlements of Barczyzna, Chwałszyce, Gąsiorowo, Gierłatowo, Kokoszki, Mała Górka, Mystki, Nekielka, Opatówko, Podstolice, Racławki, Rajmundowo, Starczanowo, Stępocin, Stroszki, Targowa Górka and Zasutowo.

== Neighbouring gminas ==
Gmina Nekla is bordered by the gminas of Czerniejewo, Dominowo, Kostrzyn, Pobiedziska and Września.
