= Podstolice, Września County =

Podstolice
- Village
- Location within Poland
- Coordinates: 52°21′N 17°29′E
- Country: Poland
- Voivodeship: Greater Poland
- County: Września
- Gmina: Nekla

Podstolice [pɔtstɔˈlit͡sɛ] is a village in the administrative district of Gmina Nekla, within Września County, Greater Poland Voivodeship, in west-central Poland.

== Landmarks ==
- Podstolice Manor House
