= Turza Wielka, Warmian-Masurian Voivodeship =

Turza Wielka
- Village
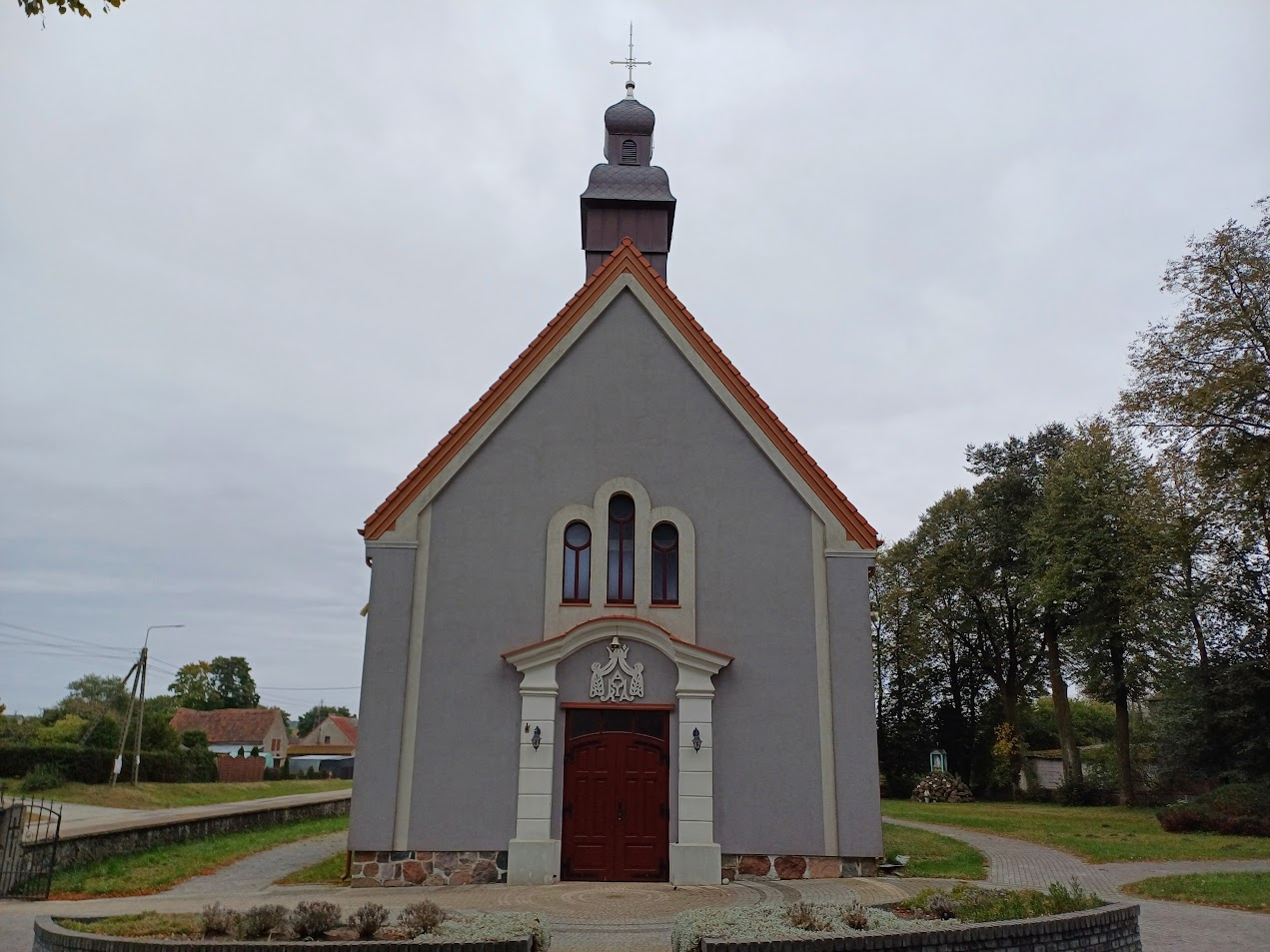
- Church of Our Lady of the Rosary

- Location within Poland
- Coordinates: 53°18′N 20°5′E
- Country: Poland
- Voivodeship: Warmian-Masurian
- County: Działdowo
- Gmina: Działdowo

Population
  - Total: 696

Turza Wielka [ˈtuʐa ˈvjɛlka] (until 1920: German: Groß Tauersee) is a village in the administrative district of Gmina Działdowo, within Działdowo County, Warmian-Masurian Voivodeship, in northern Poland.
