= Nekla =

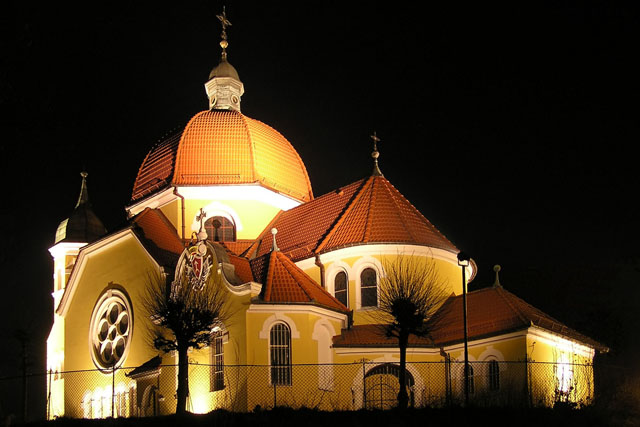
- Church of Saint Andrew the Apostle

- Coat of arms

- Location within Poland
- Coordinates: 52°22′N 17°25′E
- Country: Poland
- Voivodeship: Greater Poland
- County: Września
- Gmina: Nekla

Area
  - Total: 19.79 km^{2} (7.64 sq mi)

Population (2006)
  - Total: 3,203
  - Density: 161.8/km^{2} (419.2/sq mi)
- Time zone: UTC+1 (CET)
  - Summer (DST): UTC+2 (CEST)
- Postal code: 62-330
- Vehicle registration: PWR
- Website: http://www.nekla.eu/

Nekla [ˈnɛkla] is a town in Września County, Greater Poland Voivodeship, Poland, with 6,750 inhabitants (2004). It is situated on the Moskawa River, a tributary of Warta.

== History ==
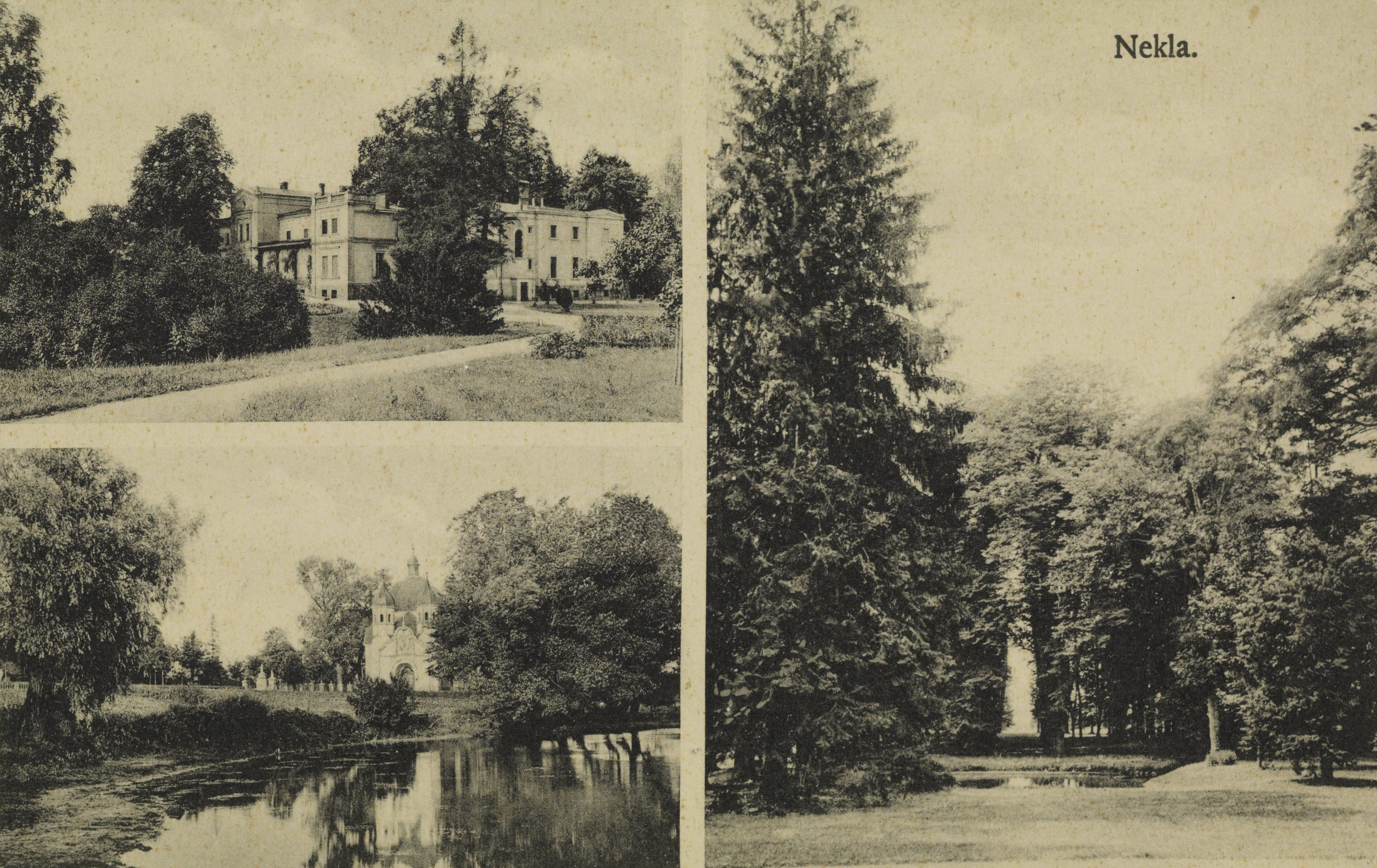
Early 20th-century postcard from Nekla

As part of the region of Greater Poland, i.e. the cradle of the Polish state, the area formed part of Poland since its establishment in the 10th century. Nekla was a private village of Polish nobility, and later a private town, administratively located in the Pyzdry County in the Kalisz Voivodeship in the Greater Poland Province of the Kingdom of Poland. A route connecting Warsaw with Poznań and Dresden ran through the town in the 18th century and King Augustus III of Poland often traveled that route.

During the German invasion and occupation of Poland (World War II), the local Polish people were subjected to various atrocities. Already on September 12, 1939, the Einsatzgruppe VI committed a massacre of several Poles. Several prominent Poles from Nekla were among the victims of a massacre of Poles committed by the Germans in nearby Kostrzyn on October 20, 1939 as part of the genocidal Intelligenzaktion campaign. The Polish resistance movement was present in Nekla. In 1944, the Gestapo arrested the commander of the local unit of the Home Army, who was then imprisoned in Żabikowo and the Mauthausen concentration camp, yet he survived and returned to Nekla in 1947, where he became a school principal.

== Transport ==
National road 92 passes to the north of Nekla.

Nekla has a station on the Poznań-Warsaw railway line.

The nearest airport is Poznań-Ławica Airport.
