= Mateusz Sobotka =

Polish footballer

Personal information
- Date of birth: 31 December 2004 (age 21)
- Place of birth: Działdowo, Poland
- Height: 1.73 m (5 ft 8 in)
- Positions: Midfielder; forward

Team information
- Current team: Start Nidzica
- Number: 27

Youth career
- 2014–2017: Dwójka Nidzica
- 2017–2018: Start Nidzica
- 2018: Talent Warsaw
- 2018–2020: Start Nidzica

Senior career*
Years	Team	Apps	(Gls)
2020–2022	Start Nidzica	23	(14)
2021	→ Stomil Olsztyn II (loan)	3	(1)
2022	Sokół Ostróda	7	(1)
2022–2024	Stomil Olsztyn	4	(0)
2023	→ Mławianka Mława (loan)	14	(1)
2023–2024	→ GKS Wikielec (loan)	21	(0)
2024–	Start Nidzica	27	(8)
- * Club domestic league appearances and goals as of 12:47, 20 June 2025 (UTC)

Mateusz Sobotka (born 31 December 2004) is a Polish professional footballer who plays as a forward for IV liga Warmia-Masuria club Start Nidzica.

== Club career ==
Born in Działdowo, Sobotka progressed through the youth ranks of Dwójka Nidzica, Start Nidzica and Talent Warsaw, also having a short spell at Stomil Olsztyn. From July until August 2021, Sobotka spent time training with German giants Bayern Munich, as part of their "World Squad" initiative. In February 2022, he moved to Sokół Ostróda.

He went on to join fellow II liga side Stomil Olsztyn, before joining III liga side Mławianka Mława on loan in February 2023.

== Career statistics ==
As of match played 18 June 2025

Appearances and goals by club, season and competition
Club	Season	League			Polish Cup		Other		Total	
Club	Season	Division	Apps	Goals	Apps	Goals	Apps	Goals	Apps	Goals
Start Nidzica	2020–21	Regional league	16	6	—		—		16	6
Start Nidzica	2021–22	Regional league	7	8	—		—		7	8
Start Nidzica	Total		23	14	0	0	0	0	23	14
Stomil Olsztyn II (loan)	2020–21	IV liga Warmia-Masuria	3	1	—		—		3	1
Sokół Ostróda	2021–22	II liga	7	1	—		—		7	1
Stomil Olsztyn	2022–23	II liga	4	0	1	0	—		5	0
Mławianka Mława (loan)	2022–23	III liga, group I	14	1	—		—		14	1
GKS Wikielec (loan)	2023–24	III liga, group I	21	0	—		—		21	0
Start Nidzica	2024–25	IV liga Warmia-Masuria	27	8	—		—		27	8
Career total			99	25	1	0	0	0	100	25
