= Lipówka, Warmian-Masurian Voivodeship =

Lipówka
- Village
- Location within Poland
- Coordinates: 53°22′55″N 20°9′44″E
- Country: Poland
- Voivodeship: Warmian-Masurian
- County: Działdowo
- Gmina: Działdowo
- Population: 116

Lipówka [liˈpufka] is a village in the administrative district of Gmina Działdowo, within Działdowo County, Warmian-Masurian Voivodeship, in northern Poland.
