= Petrykozy, Warmian-Masurian Voivodeship =

Petrykozy
- Village
- Location within Poland
- Coordinates: 53°9′N 20°8′E
- Country: Poland
- Voivodeship: Warmian-Masurian
- County: Działdowo
- Gmina: Działdowo
- Population: 312

Petrykozy [pɛtrɨˈkɔzɨ] is a village in the administrative district of Gmina Działdowo, within Działdowo County, Warmian-Masurian Voivodeship, in northern Poland.
