= Krasnołąka, Działdowo County =

Krasnołąka
- Village
- Location within Poland
- Coordinates: 53°17′N 20°13′E
- Country: Poland
- Voivodeship: Warmian-Masurian
- County: Działdowo
- Gmina: Działdowo
- Population: 320

Krasnołąka [krasnɔˈwɔnka] is a village in the administrative district of Gmina Działdowo. It is within Działdowo County, Warmian-Masurian Voivodeship in northern Poland. It lies approximately 7 km northwest of Działdowo and about 65 km south of Olsztyn, the regional capital.

== Population ==
According to recent data, the village has a population of about 320 inhabitants.

== History ==
The area around Krasnołąka has been inhabited since the Middle Ages.

During the 13th and 14th centuries, the region came under the control of the Teutonic Order, which established a network of settlements and castles throughout southern Prussia. The village subsequently became part of the historical region of East Prussia.

Following the First World War, the nearby town of Działdowo and the surrounding area were transferred to Poland under the Treaty of Versailles after the Soldau Action of 1920. During the Second World War, the region was occupied by Nazi Germany and experienced significant destruction and population losses. After the war, it returned to Poland and became part of the Olsztyn Voivodeship, and since the 1999 administrative reform it has belonged to the Warmian-Masurian Voivodeship.
