= Stępocin =

- Village
- Location within Poland
- Coordinates: 52°20′N 17°25′E
- Country: Poland
- Voivodeship: Greater Poland
- County: Września
- Gmina: Nekla

Stępocin [stɛmˈpɔt͡ɕin] is a village in the administrative district of Gmina Nekla, within Września County, Greater Poland Voivodeship, in west-central Poland.
