= Wysoka, Działdowo County =

Wysoka
- Village
- Location within Poland
- Coordinates: 53°14′N 20°5′E
- Country: Poland
- Voivodeship: Warmian-Masurian
- County: Działdowo
- Gmina: Działdowo
- Population: 380

Wysoka [vɨˈsɔka] is a village in the administrative district of Gmina Działdowo, within Działdowo County, Warmian-Masurian Voivodeship, in northern Poland. It is approximately 7 km (4 mi) west of Działdowo and 67 km (42 mi) southwest of the regional capital Olsztyn.
