= Gąsiorowo, Greater Poland Voivodeship =

Gąsiorowo
- Village
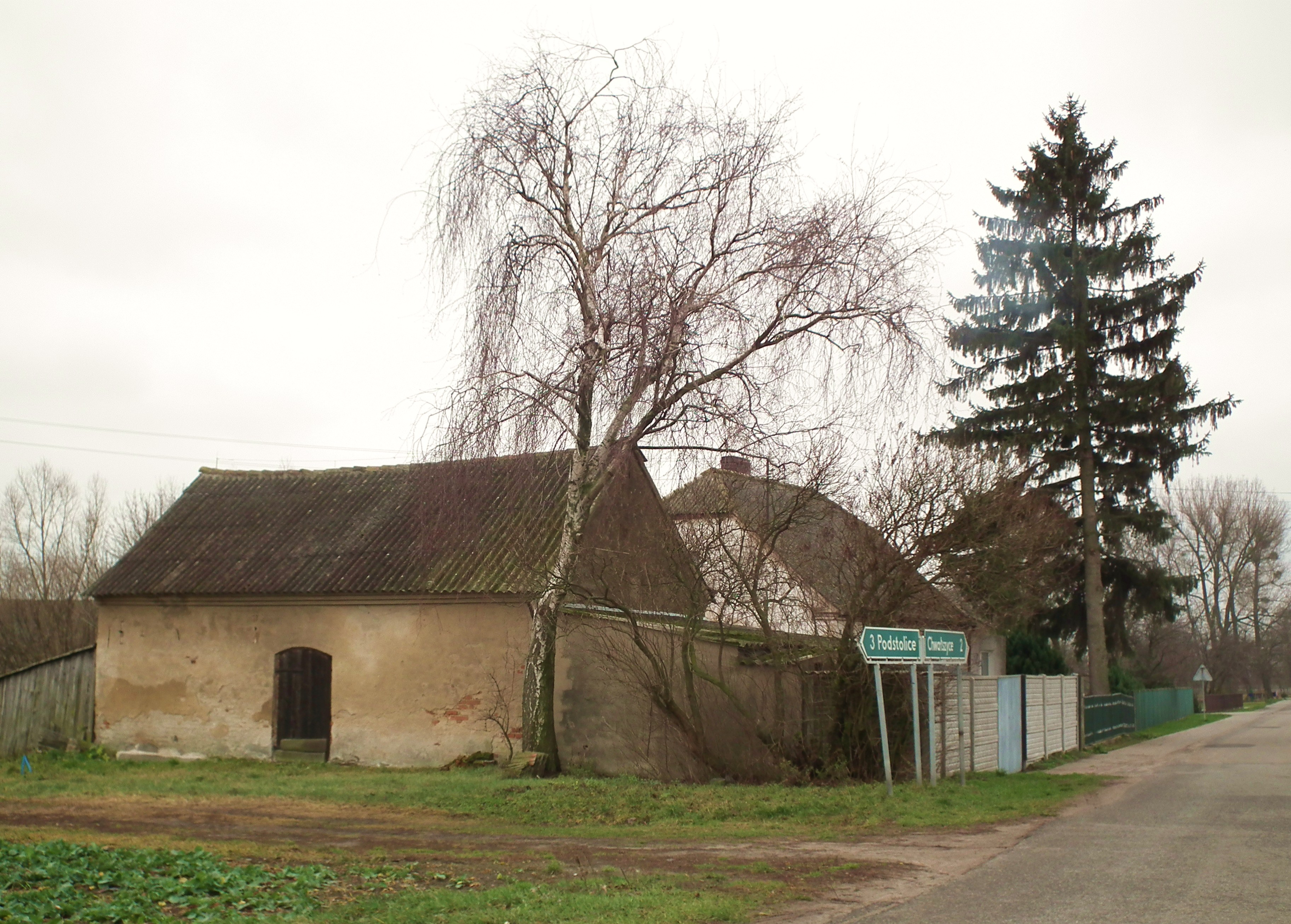
- Houses by the roadside of Gąsiorowo

- Location within Poland
- Coordinates: 52°20′18″N 17°26′07″E
- Country: Poland
- Voivodeship: Greater Poland
- County: Września
- Gmina: Nekla

Gąsiorowo [ɡɔ̃ɕɔˈrɔvɔ] is a village in the administrative district of Gmina Nekla, within Września County, Greater Poland Voivodeship, in west-central Poland.
