= Kisiny =

- Village
- Location within Poland
- Coordinates: 53°13′N 20°12′E
- Country: Poland
- Voivodeship: Warmian-Masurian
- County: Działdowo
- Gmina: Działdowo

Population
  - Total: 593
- Time zone: UTC+1 (CET)
  - Summer (DST): UTC+2 (CEST)
- Vehicle registration: NDZ

Kisiny [kiˈɕinɨ] is a village in the administrative district of Gmina Działdowo, within Działdowo County, Warmian-Masurian Voivodeship, in northern Poland. It is located in Masuria.

It was founded in the 1340s. As of 1542, the population was solely Polish.
