= Komorniki, Warmian-Masurian Voivodeship =

Komorniki
- Village
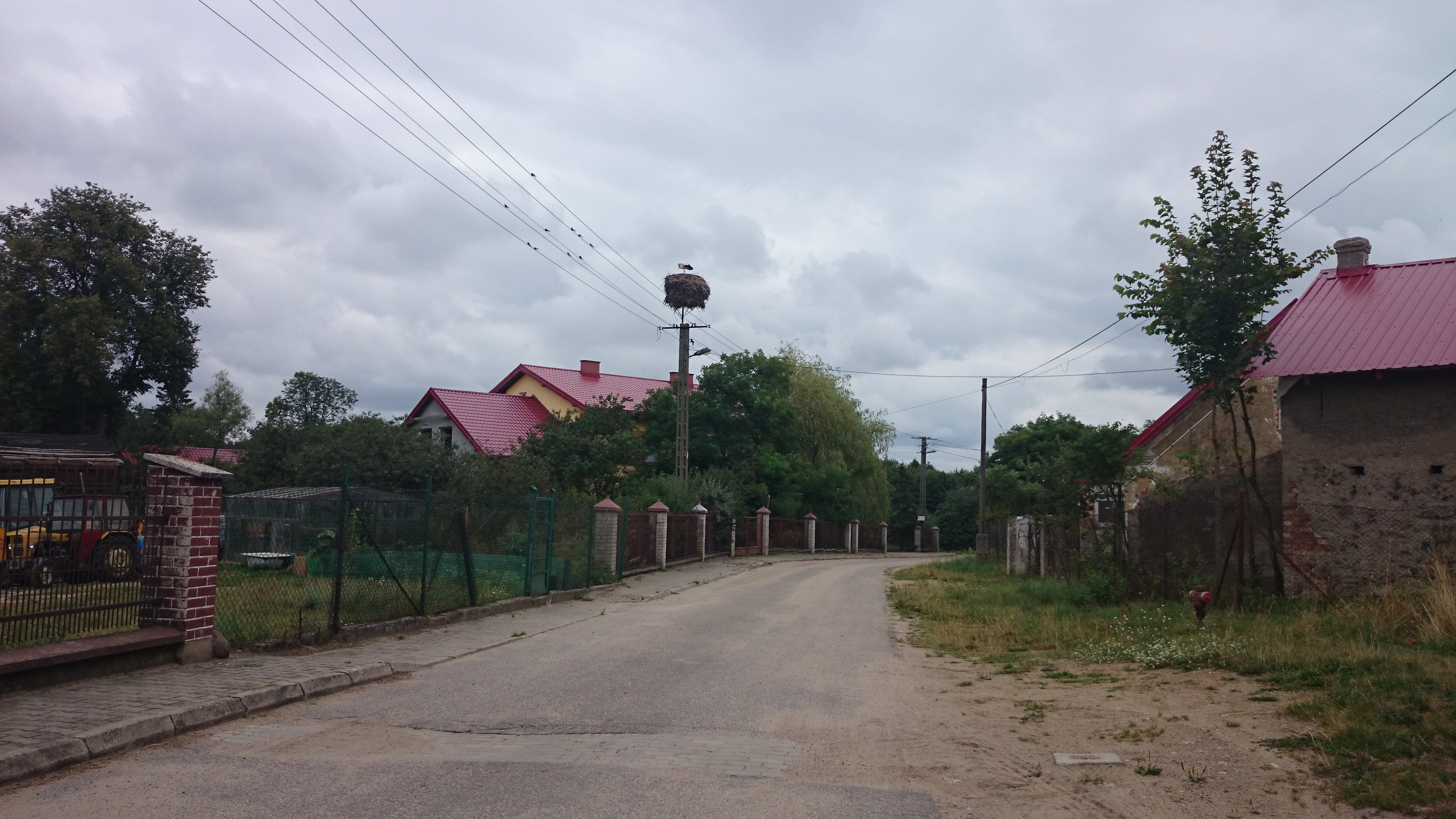

- Location within Poland
- Coordinates: 53°15′N 20°12′E
- Country: Poland
- Voivodeship: Warmian-Masurian
- County: Działdowo
- Gmina: Działdowo

Population
  - Total: 85
- Time zone: UTC+1 (CET)
  - Summer (DST): UTC+2 (CEST)
- Vehicle registration: NDZ

Komorniki [kɔmɔrˈniki] is a village in the administrative district of Gmina Działdowo, within Działdowo County, Warmian-Masurian Voivodeship, in northern Poland. It is located in the historic region of Masuria.

During the German occupation of Poland (World War II), the Komorniki forest was the site of massacres of Poles from the Soldau concentration camp, committed by the occupiers from December 1939 to May 1940 (see Nazi crimes against the Polish nation).
