= Dolní Dvůr =

- Municipality
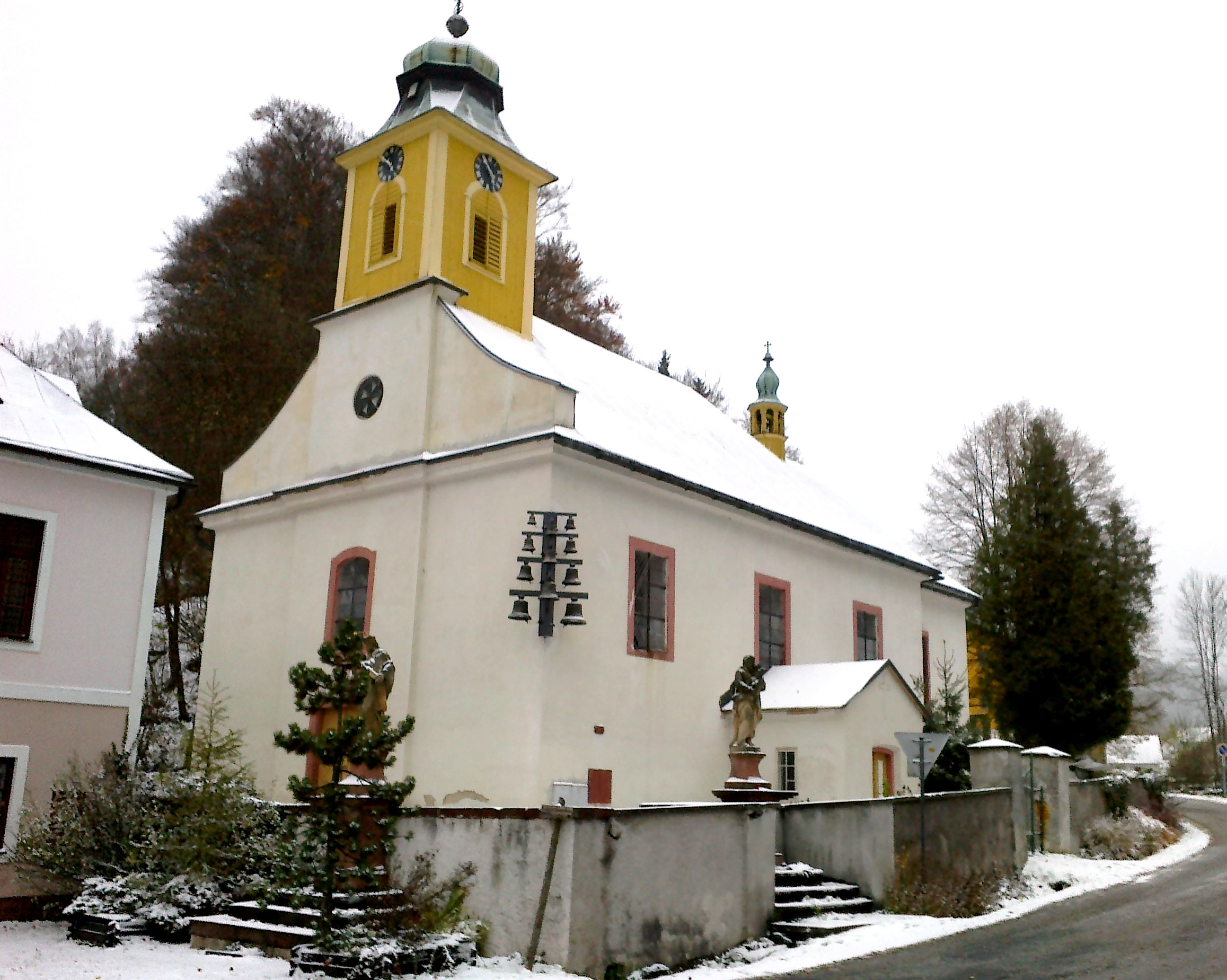
- Church of Saint Joseph

- Flag Coat of arms

- Location in the Czech Republic
- Coordinates: 50°39′8″N 15°39′20″E
- Country: Czech Republic
- Region: Hradec Králové
- District: Trutnov
- First mentioned: 1539

Area
  - Total: 15.29 km^{2} (5.90 sq mi)
- Elevation: 641 m (2,103 ft)

Population (2026-01-01)
  - Total: 260
  - Density: 17/km^{2} (44/sq mi)
- Time zone: UTC+1 (CET)
  - Summer (DST): UTC+2 (CEST)
- Postal code: 543 42
- Website: www.dolnidvur.cz

Dolní Dvůr (German: Niederhof) is a municipality and village in Trutnov District in the Hradec Králové Region of the Czech Republic. It has about 300 inhabitants.

== Etymology ==
The name literally means 'lower court' in Czech.

== Geography ==
Dolní Dvůr is located about 19 kilometres (12 mi) northwest of Trutnov and 50 km (31 mi) north of Hradec Králové. It lies in the Giant Mountains. The highest point is located on the slopes of the Liščí hora Mountain at 1,284 m (4,213 ft) above sea level. Most of the municipal territory lies within the Krkonoše National Park. The Malé Labe River flows through the municipality and creates a valley, in which the villages are situated.

== History ==
The first written mention of Dolní Dvůr is from 1539. In 1601, the village was separated from Lánov and the municipality was founded.

== Demographics ==
Historical population

| Year | Pop. | ±% |
|---|---|---|
| 1869 | 1,352 | — |
| 1880 | 1,324 | −2.1% |
| 1890 | 1,279 | −3.4% |
| 1900 | 1,301 | +1.7% |
| 1910 | 1,183 | −9.1% |

| Year | Pop. | ±% |
|---|---|---|
| 1921 | 1,020 | −13.8% |
| 1930 | 998 | −2.2% |
| 1950 | 341 | −65.8% |
| 1961 | 347 | +1.8% |
| 1970 | 307 | −11.5% |

| Year | Pop. | ±% |
|---|---|---|
| 1980 | 268 | −12.7% |
| 1991 | 244 | −9.0% |
| 2001 | 249 | +2.0% |
| 2011 | 272 | +9.2% |
| 2021 | 249 | −8.5% |

Source: Censuses

== Transport ==
There are no railways or major roads passing through the municipality.

== Sport ==
Dolní Dvůr is known for a ski resort with eight ski slopes.

== Sights ==
The main landmark of Dolní Dvůr is the Church of Saint Joseph. It was built in the Neoclassical style in 1802–1806. It is equipped with a unique carillon.
