= Drzazgi, Działdowo County =

Drzazgi
- Village
- Location within Poland
- Coordinates: 53°18′N 20°3′E
- Country: Poland
- Voivodeship: Warmian-Masurian
- County: Działdowo
- Gmina: Działdowo
- Population: 12

Drzazgi [ˈdʐazɡi] is a village in the administrative district of Gmina Działdowo, within Działdowo County, Warmian-Masurian Voivodeship, in northern Poland.
