= Starczanowo, Września County =

Starczanowo
- Village
- Location within Poland
- Coordinates: 52°21′51″N 17°23′04″E
- Country: Poland
- Voivodeship: Greater Poland
- County: Września
- Gmina: Nekla

Starczanowo [start͡ʂaˈnɔvɔ] is a village in the administrative district of Gmina Nekla, within Września County, Greater Poland Voivodeship, in west-central Poland.
