= Malinowo, Działdowo County =

Malinowo
- Village
- Location within Poland
- Coordinates: 53°14′N 20°13′E
- Country: Poland
- Voivodeship: Warmian-Masurian
- County: Działdowo
- Gmina: Działdowo

Population
  - Total: 115
- Time zone: UTC+1 (CET)
  - Summer (DST): UTC+2 (CEST)
- Vehicle registration: NDZ

Malinowo [maliˈnɔvɔ] is a village in the administrative district of Gmina Działdowo, within Działdowo County, Warmian-Masurian Voivodeship, in northern Poland. It is located in the historic region of Masuria.

During the German occupation of Poland (World War II), the Malinowo forest was the site of German massacres of Poles from the Soldau concentration camp (see Nazi crimes against the Polish nation).
