= Gąsiorowo, Działdowo County =

Gąsiorowo
- Village
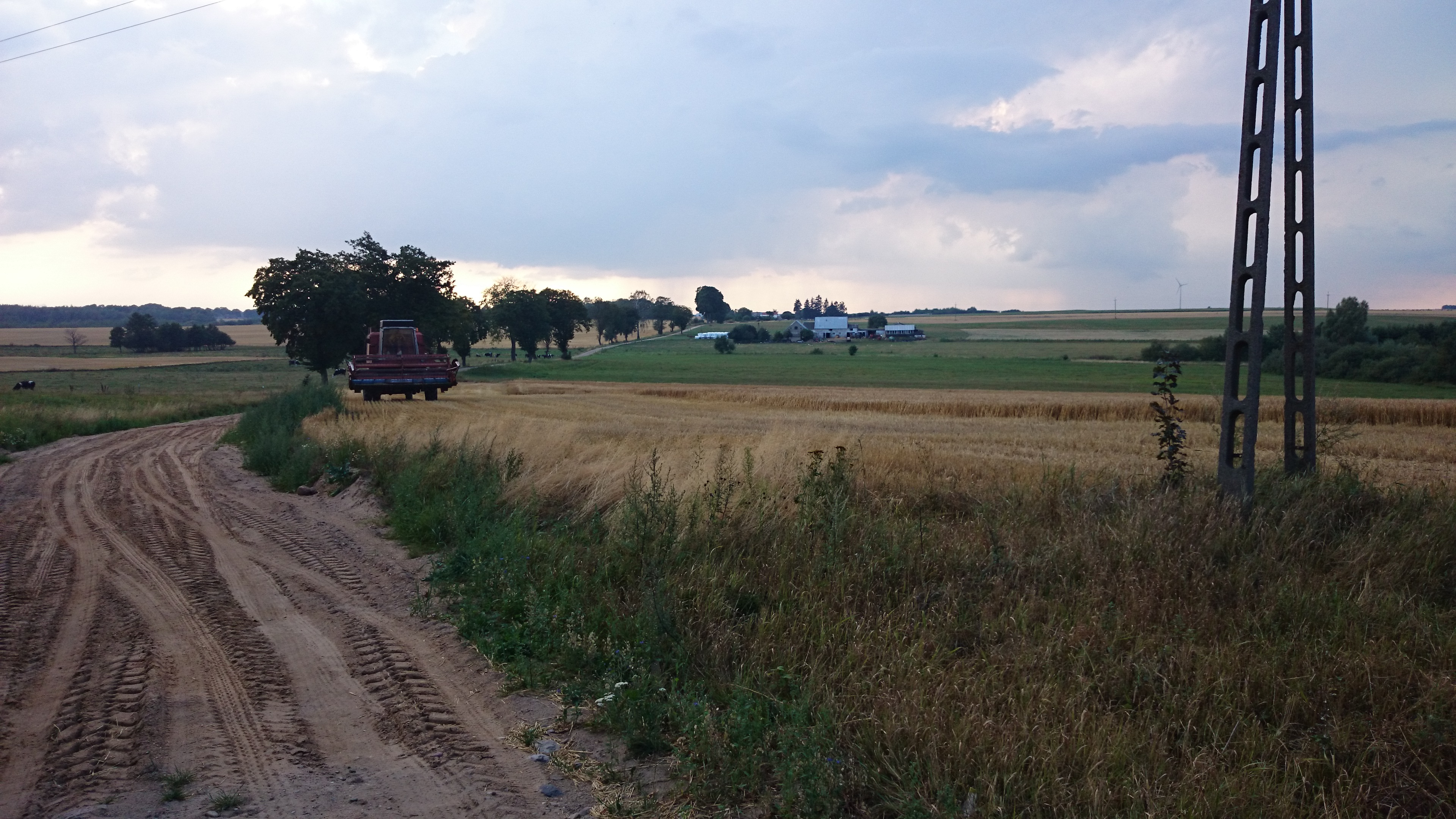

- Location within Poland
- Coordinates: 53°23′N 20°10′E
- Country: Poland
- Voivodeship: Warmian-Masurian
- County: Działdowo
- Gmina: Działdowo

Population
  - Total: 263
- Postal code: 13-200

Gąsiorowo [ɡɔ̃ɕɔˈrɔvɔ] is a village in the administrative district of Gmina Działdowo, within Działdowo County, Warmian-Masurian Voivodeship, in northern Poland.
