= Lidzbark (disambiguation) =

Lidzbark is a town in Warmian-Masurian Voivodeship, Poland.

Lidzbark may also refer to:

- Gmina Lidzbark, an urban-rural gmina (administrative district) with seat at Lidzbark
- Lidzbark-Nadleśnictwo, a settlement in Gmina Lidzbark
- Lake Lidzbark
- Lidzbark Warmiński, a larger town, also in Warmian-Masurian Voivodeship
  - Gmina Lidzbark Warmiński, a gmina with seat at Lidzbark Warmiński
  - Lidzbark County, a larger administrative district also with seat at Lidzbark Warmiński
  - Lidzbark Warmiński railway station, former railway station
