= Wel =

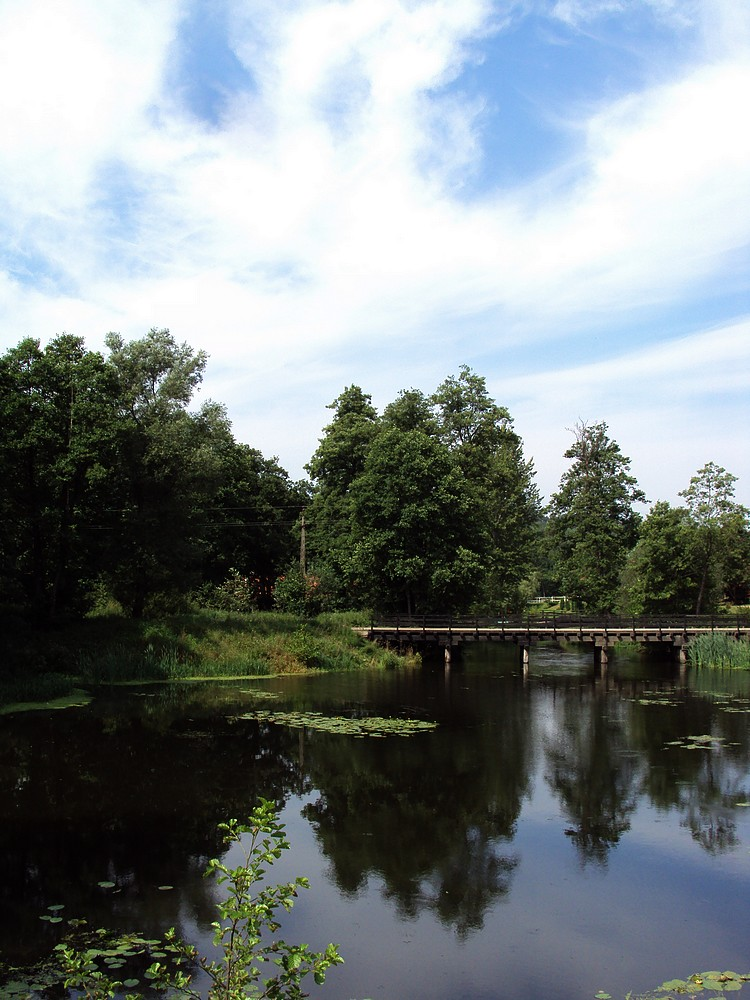

Location
- Country: Poland

Physical characteristics
- Mouth
  - location: Drwęca
  - coordinates: 53.4577°N 19.6065°E

Basin features
- Progression: Drwęca→ Vistula→ Baltic Sea

The Wel [vɛl] (German: Welle) is a river in Poland. It flows out of the Great Dąbrowa and Little Dąbrowa lakes near Dąbrówno, following a course of 118 km first that goes southwest and then north. It is a tributary of the Drwęca river, ending at Bratian. Lidzbark Welski is the largest town on the Wel.

The river gives its name to the protected area called Wel Landscape Park.
