= Nick, Warmian-Masurian Voivodeship =

Nick
- Village
- Location within Poland
- Coordinates: 53°13′N 19°56′E
- Country: Poland
- Voivodeship: Warmian-Masurian
- County: Działdowo
- Gmina: Lidzbark

Nick [nit͡sk] is a village in the administrative district of Gmina Lidzbark, within Działdowo County, Warmian-Masurian Voivodeship in northern Poland, approximately 9 km (6 mi) southeast of Lidzbark, 17 km (11 mi) west of Działdowo and 74 km (46 mi) southwest of the regional capital, Olsztyn.
