= Zalesie =

Zalesie may refer to:

== Places in Poland ==
=== Greater Poland Voivodeship (west-central Poland) ===
- Zalesie, Gmina Krzymów
- Zalesie, Gmina Ostrów Wielkopolski
- Zalesie, Gmina Skulsk
- Zalesie, Gostyń County
- Zalesie, Jarocin County
- Zalesie, Koło County
- Zalesie, Ostrzeszów County
- Zalesie, Rawicz County
- Zalesie, Słupca County
- Zalesie, Szamotuły County
- Zalesie, Złotów County

=== Kuyavian-Pomeranian Voivodeship (north-central Poland) ===
- Zalesie, Bydgoszcz County
- Zalesie, Chełmno County
- Zalesie, Nakło County
- Zalesie, Sępólno County
- Zalesie, Toruń County
- Zalesie, Tuchola County
- Zalesie, Włocławek County
- Zalesie, Żnin County

=== Lesser Poland Voivodeship (south Poland) ===
- Zalesie, Gmina Iwanowice
- Zalesie, Gmina Świątniki Górne
- Zalesie, Dąbrowa County
- Zalesie, Limanowa County

=== Łódź Voivodeship (central Poland) ===
- Zalesie, Gmina Drużbice
- Zalesie, Gmina Kodrąb
- Zalesie, Gmina Wartkowice
- Zalesie, Gmina Wielgomłyny
- Zalesie, Gmina Zadzim
- Zalesie, Gmina Zelów
- Zalesie, Brzeziny County
- Zalesie, Kutno County
- Zalesie, Łask County
- Zalesie, Łowicz County
- Zalesie, Skierniewice County
- Zalesie, Gmina Budziszewice, Tomaszów County

=== Lower Silesian Voivodeship (south-west Poland) ===
- Zalesie, Kłodzko County
- Zalesie, Lubin County

=== Lublin Voivodeship (east Poland) ===
- Zalesie, Gmina Bełżyce
- Zalesie, Gmina Izbica
- Zalesie, Gmina Kraśniczyn
- Zalesie, Gmina Niemce
- Zalesie, Gmina Zalesie, Biała County
- Zalesie, Kraśnik County
- Zalesie, Łęczna County
- Zalesie, Łuków County
- Zalesie, Ryki County
- Zalesie, Zamość County

=== Masovian Voivodeship (east-central Poland) ===
- Zalesie, Gmina Błędów
- Zalesie, Gmina Chynów
- Zalesie, Gmina Grójec
- Zalesie, Gmina Karniewo
- Zalesie, Gmina Korytnica
- Zalesie, Gmina Myszyniec
- Zalesie, Gmina Nowe Miasto nad Pilicą
- Zalesie, Gmina Ostrów Mazowiecka
- Zalesie, Gmina Pionki
- Zalesie, Gmina Sadowne
- Zalesie, Gmina Siennica
- Zalesie, Gmina Skaryszew
- Zalesie, Gmina Stanisławów
- Zalesie, Gmina Strzegowo
- Zalesie, Gmina Sypniewo
- Zalesie, Gmina Szydłowo
- Zalesie, Ciechanów County
- Zalesie, Gmina Żabia Wola
- Zalesie, Kozienice County
- Zalesie, Łosice County
- Zalesie, Przasnysz County
- Zalesie, Siedlce County
- Zalesie, Sierpc County
- Zalesie, Sochaczew County
- Zalesie, Warsaw West County
- Zalesie, Wołomin County

=== Podlaskie Voivodeship (north-east Poland) ===
- Zalesie, Gmina Mały Płock
- Zalesie, Gmina Nurzec-Stacja
- Zalesie, Gmina Siemiatycze
- Zalesie, Gmina Stawiski
- Zalesie, Białystok County
- Zalesie, Grajewo County
- Zalesie, Mońki County
- Zalesie, Sokółka County

=== Pomeranian Voivodeship (north Poland) ===
- Zalesie, Chojnice County
- Zalesie, Człuchów County

=== Subcarpathian Voivodeship (south-east Poland) ===
- Zalesie, Gmina Miejsce Piastowe, Krosno County
- Zalesie, Łańcut County
- Zalesie, Nisko County
- Zalesie, Przemyśl County
- Zalesie, Stalowa Wola County

=== Świętokrzyskie Voivodeship (south-central Poland) ===
- Zalesie, Jędrzejów County
- Zalesie, Kielce County
- Zalesie, Staszów County
- Zalesie, Włoszczowa County

=== Warmian-Masurian Voivodeship (north Poland) ===
- Zalesie, Gmina Lidzbark
- Zalesie, Gmina Płośnica
- Zalesie, Elbląg County
- Zalesie, Nidzica County
- Zalesie, Olecko County
- Zalesie, Olsztyn County
- Zalesie, Ostróda County
- Zalesie, Pisz County
- Zalesie, Szczytno County

=== West Pomeranian Voivodeship (north-west Poland) ===
- Zalesie, Choszczno County
- Zalesie, Kamień County
- Zalesie, Police County
- Zalesie, Sławno County

=== Other voivodeships ===
- Zalesie, Opole Voivodeship (south-west Poland)
- Zalesie, Silesian Voivodeship (south Poland)
- Zalesie Śląskie, Opole Voivodeship

== See also ==
- Zálesie (disambiguation), for places in Slovakia
- Zalesje (disambiguation)
- Zalesye, a historical region of Russia
