= Rumian =

Rumian or Rumyan may refer to:

- Rumian, Warmian-Masurian Voivodeship, a village in Poland
- Rumian railway station, in Punjab
- Rumyan Castle, in Iran
- Rumyan Hovsepyan, Armenian football player
- Rumyan Khristov, Bulgarian rower
- Rumiyan, the plural of the Persian demonym Rum
