= Zalesje =

Zalesje (literally 'place beyond woods' several Slavic languages) may refer to:

- Zalesye, a historical region of Russia
- Zaļesje, a village in Latvia
  - Zaļesje Parish

== See also ==
- Zalesie (disambiguation)
