= Heilsberg =

Heilsberg may refer to:

- German name of Lidzbark Warmiński
- Battle of Heilsberg
- Transmitter Heilsberg

== See also ==
- Lidzbark
- Lidzbark (disambiguation)
