= Tarczyny =

- Village
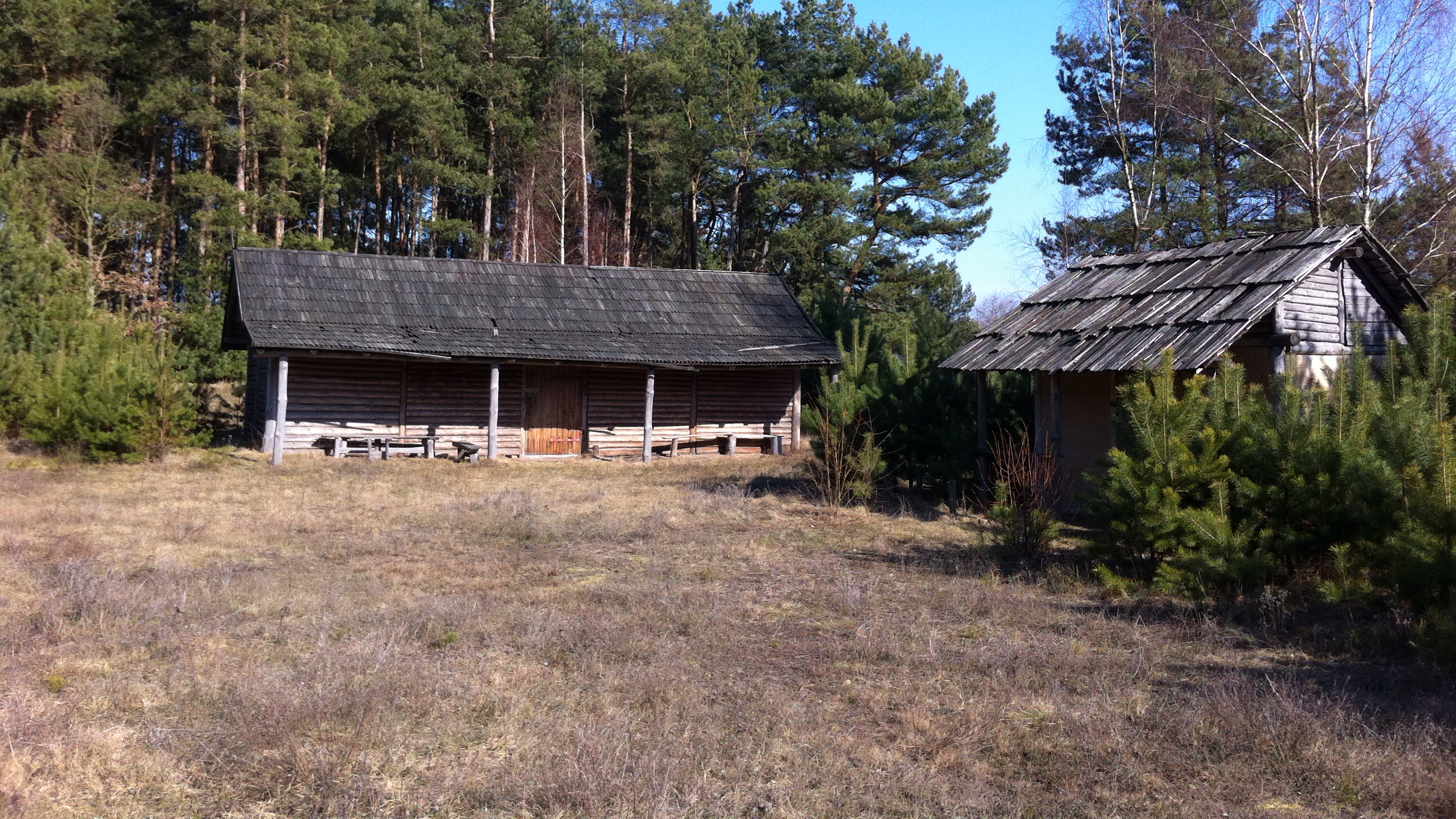
- Tarczyny - medieval settlement

- Location within Poland
- Coordinates: 53°21′N 19°52′E
- Country: Poland
- Voivodeship: Warmian-Masurian
- County: Działdowo
- Gmina: Lidzbark

Tarczyny [tarˈt͡ʂɨnɨ] is a village in the administrative district of Gmina Lidzbark, within Działdowo County, Warmian-Masurian Voivodeship, in northern Poland.
