= Koszelewki =

- Village
- Location within Poland
- Coordinates: 53°19′42″N 19°53′24″E
- Country: Poland
- Voivodeship: Warmian-Masurian
- County: Działdowo
- Gmina: Rybno

Koszelewki [kɔʂɛˈlɛfki] is a village in the administrative district of Gmina Rybno, within Działdowo County, Warmian-Masurian Voivodeship, in northern Poland. Between 1975 and 1998, the town was administratively part of the Ciechanów province.
