= Nowy Zieluń =

- Village
- Location within Poland
- Coordinates: 53°12′N 19°51′E
- Country: Poland
- Voivodeship: Warmian-Masurian
- County: Działdowo
- Gmina: Lidzbark
- Population: 119

Nowy Zieluń [ˈnɔvɨ ˈʑɛluɲ] is a village in the administrative district of Gmina Lidzbark, within Działdowo County, Warmian-Masurian Voivodeship, in northern Poland.
