= Chełsty, Warmian-Masurian Voivodeship =

Chełsty
- Village
- Location within Poland
- Coordinates: 53°18′58″N 19°47′6″E
- Country: Poland
- Voivodeship: Warmian-Masurian
- County: Działdowo
- Gmina: Lidzbark
- Population: 190

Chełsty [ˈxɛu̯stɨ] is a village in the administrative district of Gmina Lidzbark, within Działdowo County, Warmian-Masurian Voivodeship, in northern Poland.
