= Mały Łęck =

- Village
- Location within Poland
- Coordinates: 53°16′N 19°58′E
- Country: Poland
- Voivodeship: Warmian-Masurian
- County: Działdowo
- Gmina: Płośnica
- Population: 438

Mały Łęck [ˈmawɨ ˈwɛnt͡sk] is a village in the administrative district of Gmina Płośnica, within Działdowo County, Warmian-Masurian Voivodeship, in northern Poland.
