= Sarnia Góra, Warmian-Masurian Voivodeship =

Settlement in Gmina Lidzbark, Poland

Sarnia Góra
- Settlement
- Location within Poland
- Coordinates: 53°14′46″N 19°42′23″E
- Country: Poland
- Voivodeship: Warmian-Masurian
- County: Działdowo
- Gmina: Lidzbark

Sarnia Góra [ˈsarɲa ˈɡura] is a settlement in the administrative district of Gmina Lidzbark, within Działdowo County, Warmian-Masurian Voivodeship, in northern Poland.
