= Gronowo, Działdowo County =

Gronowo
- Village
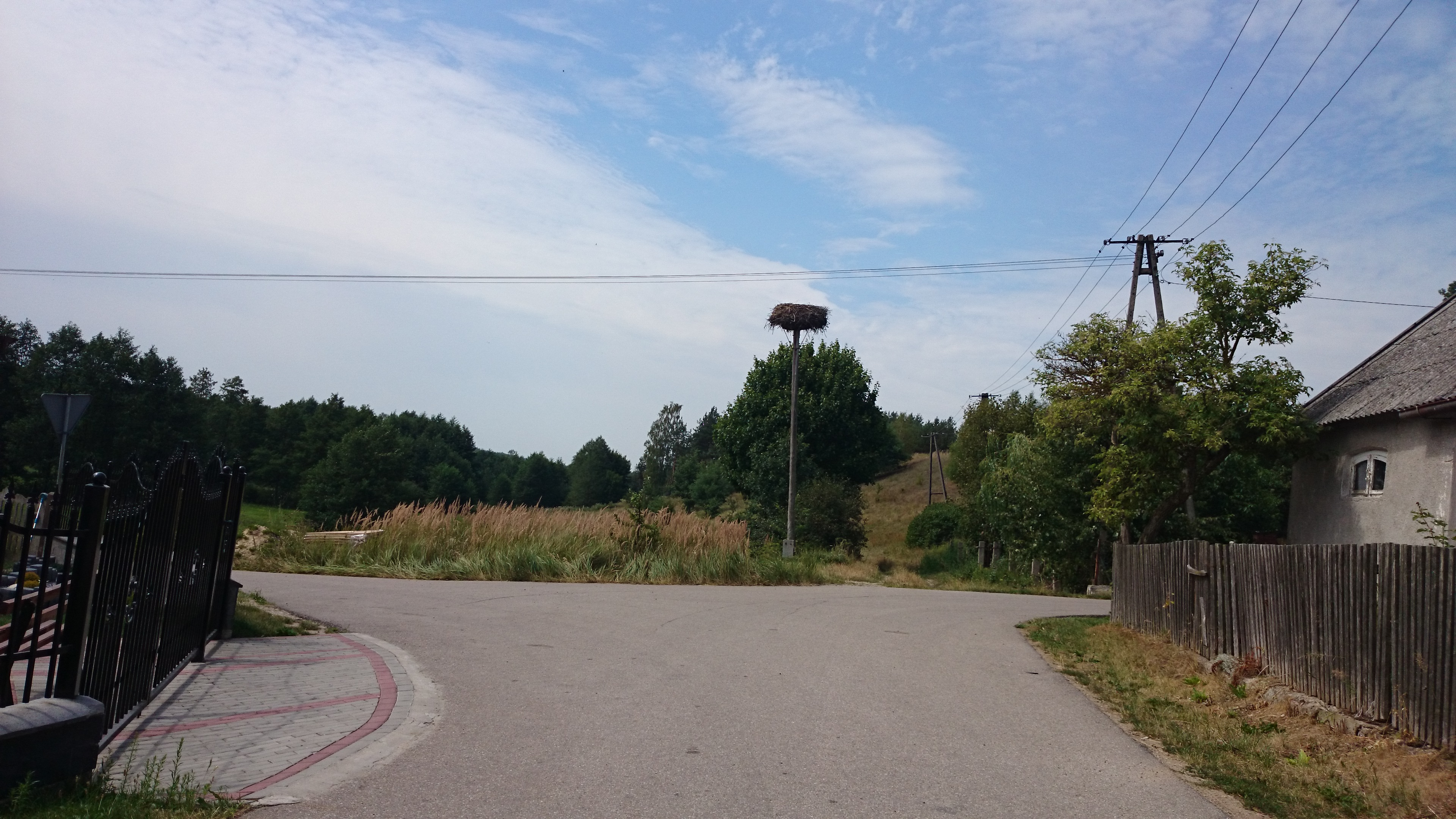

- Location within Poland
- Coordinates: 53°23′N 19°53′E
- Country: Poland
- Voivodeship: Warmian-Masurian
- County: Działdowo
- Gmina: Rybno
- Postal code: 13-220
- Vehicle registration: NDZ

Gronowo [ɡrɔˈnɔvɔ] is a village in the administrative district of Gmina Rybno, within Działdowo County, Warmian-Masurian Voivodeship, in northern Poland.

Gronowo was possibly founded under the Kingdom of Poland, and was a possession of the Diocese of Chełmno.
