= Nowy Dwór, Działdowo County =

Nowy Dwór
- Village
- Location within Poland
- Coordinates: 53°13′31″N 19°53′48″E
- Country: Poland
- Voivodeship: Warmian-Masurian
- County: Działdowo
- Gmina: Lidzbark
- Population: 265

Nowy Dwór [ˈnɔvɨ ˈdvur] is a village in the administrative district of Gmina Lidzbark, within Działdowo County, Warmian-Masurian Voivodeship, in northern Poland.
