= Olszewo, Działdowo County =

Olszewo
- Village
- Location within Poland
- Coordinates: 53°14′58″N 19°51′20″E
- Country: Poland
- Voivodeship: Warmian-Masurian
- County: Działdowo
- Gmina: Lidzbark

Olszewo [ɔlˈʂɛvɔ] is a village in the administrative district of Gmina Lidzbark, within Działdowo County, Warmian-Masurian Voivodeship, in northern Poland.
