= Piaseczno, Działdowo County =

Piaseczno
- Settlement
- Location within Poland
- Coordinates: 53°15′29″N 19°44′30″E
- Country: Poland
- Voivodeship: Warmian-Masurian
- County: Działdowo
- Gmina: Lidzbark

Piaseczno [pjaˈsɛt͡ʂnɔ] is a settlement in the administrative district of Gmina Lidzbark, within Działdowo County, Warmian-Masurian Voivodeship, in northern Poland.
