= Zielonka, Działdowo County =

Zielonka
- Settlement
- Location within Poland
- Coordinates: 53°10′16″N 19°45′55″E
- Country: Poland
- Voivodeship: Warmian-Masurian
- County: Działdowo
- Gmina: Lidzbark

Zielonka [ʑɛˈlɔnka] is a settlement in the administrative district of Gmina Lidzbark, within Działdowo County, Warmian-Masurian Voivodeship, in northern Poland.
