= Lautenburg =

Lautenburg may refer to:

- Female and male subcamps of the Stutthof concentration camp
- The German name of Lidzbark Welski, a city in northern Poland
