= Nowa Wieś, Działdowo County =

Nowa Wieś
- Village
- Location within Poland
- Coordinates: 53°23′20″N 19°59′59″E
- Country: Poland
- Voivodeship: Warmian-Masurian
- County: Działdowo
- Gmina: Rybno
- Population: 350

Nowa Wieś [ˈnɔva ˈvjɛɕ] is a village in the administrative district of Gmina Rybno, within Działdowo County, Warmian-Masurian Voivodeship, in northern Poland.
