= Turza Mała, Warmian-Masurian Voivodeship =

Turza Mała
- Village
- Location within Poland
- Coordinates: 53°16′32″N 19°57′15″E
- Country: Poland
- Voivodeship: Warmian-Masurian
- County: Działdowo
- Gmina: Płośnica

Turza Mała [ˈtuʐa ˈmawa] is a village in the administrative district of Gmina Płośnica, within Działdowo County, Warmian-Masurian Voivodeship, in northern Poland.
