= Bryńsk Szlachecki =

- Village
- Location within Poland
- Coordinates: 53°10′55″N 19°44′57″E
- Country: Poland
- Voivodeship: Warmian-Masurian
- County: Działdowo
- Gmina: Lidzbark

Bryńsk Szlachecki (Polish pronunciation: [ˈbrɨj̃sk ʂlaˈxɛtskʲi]) is a village in the administrative district of Gmina Lidzbark, within Działdowo County, Warmian-Masurian Voivodeship, in northern Poland.
