= Ostrowy =

Ostrowy may refer to the following places:

- Ostrowy, Łódź Voivodeship (central Poland)
- Ostrowy, Gmina Gozdowo in Masovian Voivodeship (north-central Poland)
- Ostrowy, Gmina Zawidz in Masovian Voivodeship (north-central Poland)
- Ostrowy, Wyszków County in Masovian Voivodeship (east-central Poland)
- Ostrowy, Zwoleń County in Masovian Voivodeship (east-central Poland)
- Ostrowy, Greater Poland Voivodeship (central Poland)
- Ostrowy, Pomeranian Voivodeship (north Poland)
- Ostrowy, Działdowo County in Warmian-Masurian Voivodeship (north Poland)
- Ostrowy, Szczytno County in Warmian-Masurian Voivodeship (north Poland)
