= Gródki, Warmian-Masurian Voivodeship =

Gródki
- Village
- Location within Poland
- Coordinates: 53°13′49″N 20°2′0″E
- Country: Poland
- Voivodeship: Warmian-Masurian
- County: Działdowo
- Gmina: Płośnica
- Population: 860
- Website: http://www.zsrckpgrodki.pl/

Gródki [ˈɡrutki] is a village in the administrative district of Gmina Płośnica, within Działdowo County, Warmian-Masurian Voivodeship, in northern Poland.
