= Grabacz, Warmian-Masurian Voivodeship =

Grabacz
- Village
- Location within Poland
- Coordinates: 53°20′N 19°56′E
- Country: Poland
- Voivodeship: Warmian-Masurian
- County: Działdowo
- Gmina: Rybno
- Population: 43

Grabacz [ˈɡrabat͡ʂ] is a village in the administrative district of Gmina Rybno, within Działdowo County, Warmian-Masurian Voivodeship, in northern Poland.
