= Klonowo =

Klonowo may refer to the following places:

- Kłonowo, Radziejów County, Kuyavian-Pomeranian Voivodeship (north-central Poland)
- Klonowo, Golub-Dobrzyń County in Kuyavian-Pomeranian Voivodeship (north-central Poland)
- Klonowo, Tuchola County in Kuyavian-Pomeranian Voivodeship (north-central Poland)
- Klonowo, Podlaskie Voivodeship (north-east Poland)
- Klonowo, Masovian Voivodeship (east-central Poland)
- Klonowo, Działdowo County in Warmian-Masurian Voivodeship (north Poland)
- Klonowo, Ostróda County in Warmian-Masurian Voivodeship (north Poland)
