= Jeglia =

- Village
- Location within Poland
- Coordinates: 53°24′N 19°53′E
- Country: Poland
- Voivodeship: Warmian-Masurian
- County: Działdowo
- Gmina: Rybno

Jeglia [ˈjɛɡlja] is a village in the administrative district of Gmina Rybno, within Działdowo County, Warmian-Masurian Voivodeship, in northern Poland.
