= Murawki, Działdowo County =

Murawki
- Village
- Location within Poland
- Coordinates: 53°19′N 19°58′E
- Country: Poland
- Voivodeship: Warmian-Masurian
- County: Działdowo
- Gmina: Płośnica

Murawki [muˈrafki] is a village in the administrative district of Gmina Płośnica, within Działdowo County, Warmian-Masurian Voivodeship, in northern Poland.
