= Lesiak =

- Settlement
- Location within Poland
- Coordinates: 53°25′54″N 19°55′31″E
- Country: Poland
- Voivodeship: Warmian-Masurian
- County: Działdowo
- Gmina: Rybno

Lesiak [ˈlɛɕak] is a settlement in the administrative district of Gmina Rybno, within Działdowo County, Warmian-Masurian Voivodeship, in northern Poland.
