= Wel Landscape Park =

Protected area in Poland

Coordinates: 53.3204°N 19.8324°E

- Welski Park Krajobrazowy
- IUCN category V (protected landscape/seascape)
- Interactive map of Wel Landscape Park
- Location: Warmian-Masurian Voivodeship
- Area: 242.37 km^{2} (93.58 sq mi)
- Established: 1995
- Named for: Wel river

Wel Landscape Park (Welski Park Krajobrazowy) is a protected area (Landscape Park) in northern Poland, established in 1995, covering an area of 20,023.34 hectares (77.3105 sq mi)(200.2334 sq km). It takes its name from the Wel river.

The Park lies within Warmian-Masurian Voivodeship, in Działdowo County (Gmina Lidzbark, Gmina Płośnica).

Within the Landscape Park are four nature reserves including the Koziana Marsh, Ostrów Tarczyński, Piekiełko reserve, and Lake Neliwa reserve.

The park contains many species of fauna that are native to the environment such as multiple types of deer, ospreys, cranes, moor frog and many others. The park also contains lots of flora such as scots pine, marsh marigold, birch and many others.
