= Kostkowo, Warmian-Masurian Voivodeship =

Kostkowo
- Settlement
- Location within Poland
- Coordinates: 53°21′55″N 19°54′32″E
- Country: Poland
- Voivodeship: Warmian-Masurian
- County: Działdowo
- Gmina: Rybno

Kostkowo [kɔstˈkɔvɔ] is a settlement in the administrative district of Gmina Rybno, within Działdowo County, Warmian-Masurian Voivodeship, in northern Poland.
