= Biernaty, Warmian-Masurian Voivodeship =

Biernaty
- Village
- Location within Poland
- Coordinates: 53°53′22″N 19°55′7″E
- Country: Poland
- Voivodeship: Warmian-Masurian
- County: Działdowo
- Gmina: Lidzbark

Biernaty [bjɛrˈnatɨ] is a village in the administrative district of Gmina Lidzbark, within Działdowo County, Warmian-Masurian Voivodeship, in northern Poland.
