= Kiełpiny, Warmian-Masurian Voivodeship =

Kiełpiny
- Village
- Location within Poland
- Coordinates: 53°20′46″N 19°49′18″E
- Country: Poland
- Voivodeship: Warmian-Masurian
- County: Działdowo
- Gmina: Lidzbark
- Population: 430

Kiełpiny [kʲɛu̯ˈpinɨ] is a village in the administrative district of Gmina Lidzbark, within Działdowo County, Warmian-Masurian Voivodeship, in northern Poland.
