= Bladowo, Warmian-Masurian Voivodeship =

Bladowo
- Settlement
- Location within Poland
- Coordinates: 53°16′N 19°53′E
- Country: Poland
- Voivodeship: Warmian-Masurian
- County: Działdowo
- Gmina: Lidzbark

Bladowo [blaˈdɔvɔ] is a settlement in the administrative district of Gmina Lidzbark, within Działdowo County, Warmian-Masurian Voivodeship, in northern Poland.
