= Borki, Działdowo County =

Borki
- Settlement
- Location within Poland
- Coordinates: 53°15′29.15″N 19°54′50.86″E
- Country: Poland
- Voivodeship: Warmian-Masurian
- County: Działdowo
- Gmina: Lidzbark

Borki [ˈbɔrki] is a settlement in the administrative district of Gmina Lidzbark, within Działdowo County, Warmian-Masurian Voivodeship, in northern Poland.
