= Rapaty, Działdowo County =

Rapaty
- Village
- Location within Poland
- Coordinates: 53°20′52″N 20°1′31″E
- Country: Poland
- Voivodeship: Warmian-Masurian
- County: Działdowo
- Gmina: Rybno
- Population: 60

Rapaty [raˈpatɨ] is a village in the administrative district of Gmina Rybno, within Działdowo County, Warmian-Masurian Voivodeship, in northern Poland.
