= Jeleń, Działdowo County =

Jeleń
- Village
- Location within Poland
- Coordinates: 53°17′51″N 19°51′42″E
- Country: Poland
- Voivodeship: Warmian-Masurian
- County: Działdowo
- Gmina: Lidzbark
- Population (approx.): 500

Jeleń [ˈjɛlɛɲ] is a village in the administrative district of Gmina Lidzbark, within Działdowo County, Warmian-Masurian Voivodeship, in northern Poland.
