= Naguszewo =

- Village
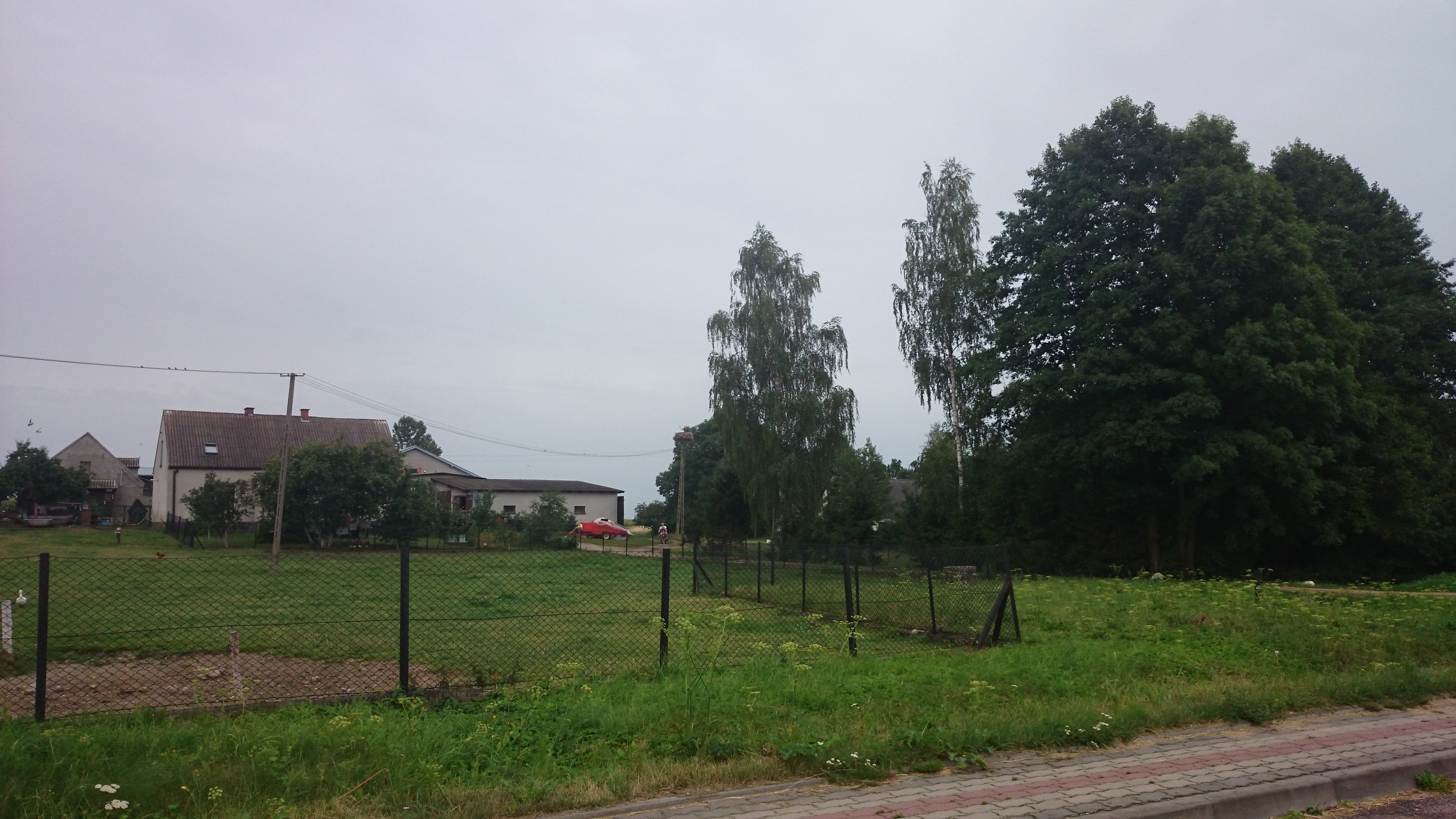

- Location within Poland
- Coordinates: 53°26′N 19°58′E
- Country: Poland
- Voivodeship: Warmian-Masurian
- County: Działdowo
- Gmina: Rybno
- Time zone: UTC+1 (CET)
  - Summer (DST): UTC+2 (CEST)
- Postal code: 13-220
- Vehicle registration: NDZ

Naguszewo [naɡuˈʂɛvɔ] is a village in the administrative district of Gmina Rybno, within Działdowo County, Warmian-Masurian Voivodeship, in northern Poland.

== History ==
During the German occupation in World War II, the occupiers operated a camp in the village, in which 480 Jewish prisoners were held on average.
