= Adamowo, Działdowo County =

Adamowo
- Village
- Location within Poland
- Coordinates: 53°10′47″N 19°55′12″E
- Country: Poland
- Voivodeship: Warmian-Masurian
- County: Działdowo
- Gmina: Lidzbark

Adamowo [adaˈmɔvɔ] is a village in the administrative district of Gmina Lidzbark, within Działdowo County, Warmian-Masurian Voivodeship, in northern Poland.
