= Zdrojek =

Zdrojek may refer to the following places:

- Zdrojek, Działdowo County in Warmian-Masurian Voivodeship (north Poland)
- Zdrojek, Nidzica County in Warmian-Masurian Voivodeship (north Poland)
- Zdrojek, Olsztyn County in Warmian-Masurian Voivodeship (north Poland)
