= Stare Dłutowo =

- Village
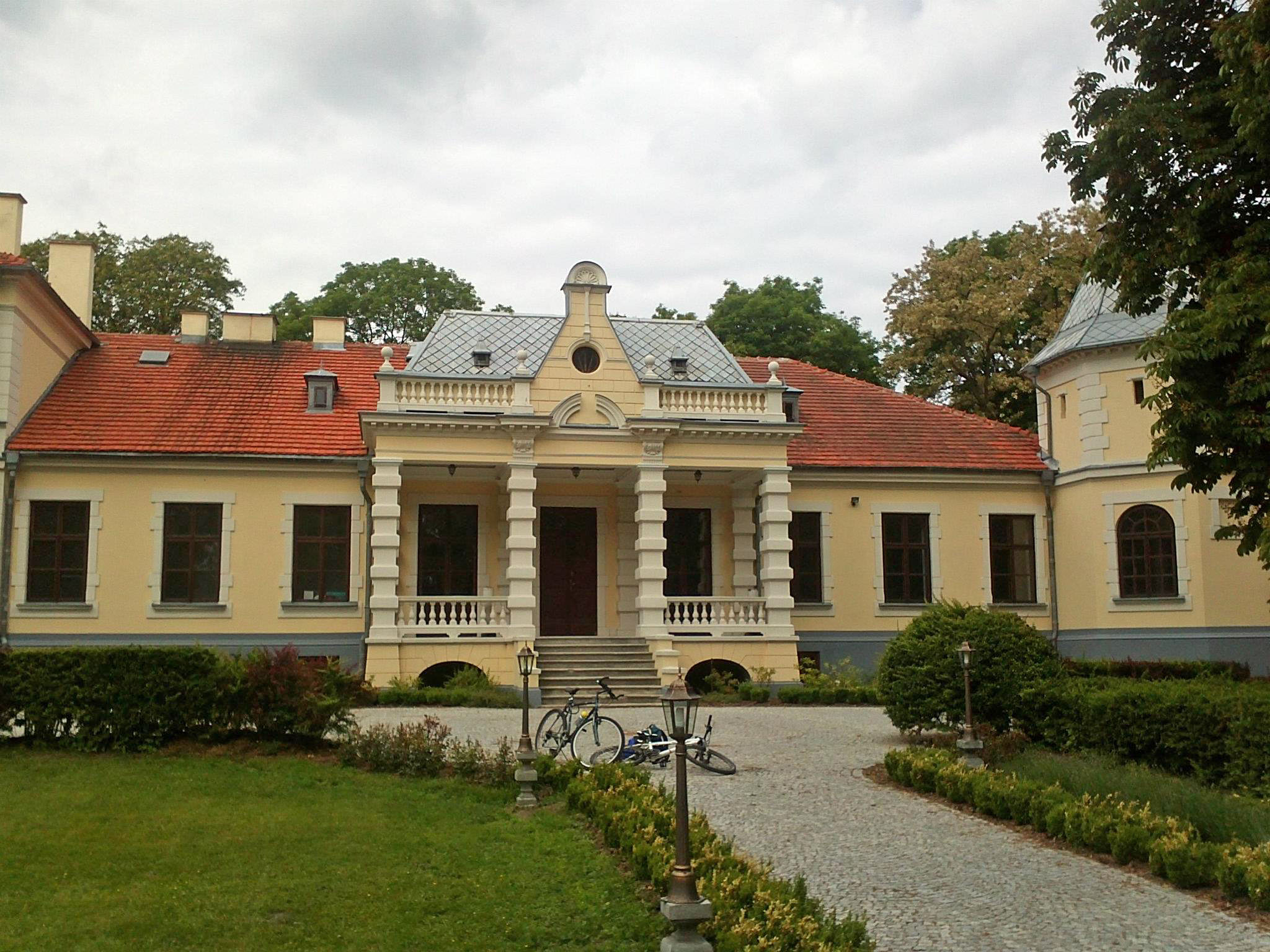
- Old manor in Stare Dłutowo

- Coat of arms

- Location within Poland
- Coordinates: 53°11′24″N 19°57′9″E
- Country: Poland
- Voivodeship: Warmian-Masurian
- County: Działdowo
- Gmina: Lidzbark

Population
  - Total: 663
- Time zone: UTC+1 (CET)
  - Summer (DST): UTC+2 (CEST)
- Postal code: 13-203

Stare Dłutowo [ˈstarɛ dwuˈtɔvɔ] is a village in the administrative district of Gmina Lidzbark, within Działdowo County, Warmian-Masurian Voivodeship, in north-central Poland.

It was a private town of Polish nobility, administratively located in the Szreńsk County in the Płock Voivodeship in the Greater Poland Province of the Kingdom of Poland.
