= Ciechanówko =

Village in Gmina Lidzbark, Poland

- Village
- Location within Poland
- Coordinates: 53°18′N 19°48′E
- Country: Poland
- Voivodeship: Warmian-Masurian
- County: Działdowo
- Gmina: Lidzbark
- Population: 43

Ciechanówko [t͡ɕɛxaˈnufkɔ] is a village in the administrative district of Gmina Lidzbark, within Działdowo County, Warmian-Masurian Voivodeship, in northern Poland.
