= Wlewsk =

- Village
- Location within Poland
- Coordinates: 53°16′N 19°46′E
- Country: Poland
- Voivodeship: Warmian-Masurian
- County: Działdowo
- Gmina: Lidzbark
- Population: 360

Wlewsk [vlɛfsk] is a village in the administrative district of Gmina Lidzbark, within Działdowo County, Warmian-Masurian Voivodeship, in northern Poland.
