= Dębowiec, Działdowo County =

Village in Gmina Lidzbark, Poland

Dębowiec
- Village
- Location within Poland
- Coordinates: 53°15′08″N 19°43′09″E
- Country: Poland
- Voivodeship: Warmian-Masurian
- County: Działdowo
- Gmina: Lidzbark

Dębowiec [dɛmˈbɔvjɛt͡s] is a village in the administrative district of Gmina Lidzbark, within Działdowo County, Warmian-Masurian Voivodeship, in northern Poland.
