= Glinki, Działdowo County =

Glinki
- Village
- Location within Poland
- Coordinates: 53°10′N 19°49′E
- Country: Poland
- Voivodeship: Warmian-Masurian
- County: Działdowo
- Gmina: Lidzbark

Glinki [ˈɡlinki] is a village in the administrative district of Gmina Lidzbark, within Działdowo County, Warmian-Masurian Voivodeship, in northern Poland.
