= Groszki, Warmian-Masurian Voivodeship =

Groszki
- Village
- Location within Poland
- Coordinates: 53°25′N 19°58′E
- Country: Poland
- Voivodeship: Warmian-Masurian
- County: Działdowo
- Gmina: Rybno
- Population: 118

Groszki [ˈɡrɔʂki] is a village in the administrative district of Gmina Rybno, within Działdowo County, Warmian-Masurian Voivodeship, in northern Poland.

The village was ceded to Poland after the East Prussian plebiscite in 1920.
