= Gruszka, Warmian-Masurian Voivodeship =

Gruszka
- Village
- Location within Poland
- Coordinates: 53°13′N 20°3′E
- Country: Poland
- Voivodeship: Warmian-Masurian
- County: Działdowo
- Gmina: Płośnica

Gruszka [ˈɡruʂka] is a village in the administrative district of Gmina Płośnica, within Działdowo County, Warmian-Masurian Voivodeship, in northern Poland.
