= Jamielnik, Działdowo County =

Jamielnik
- Village
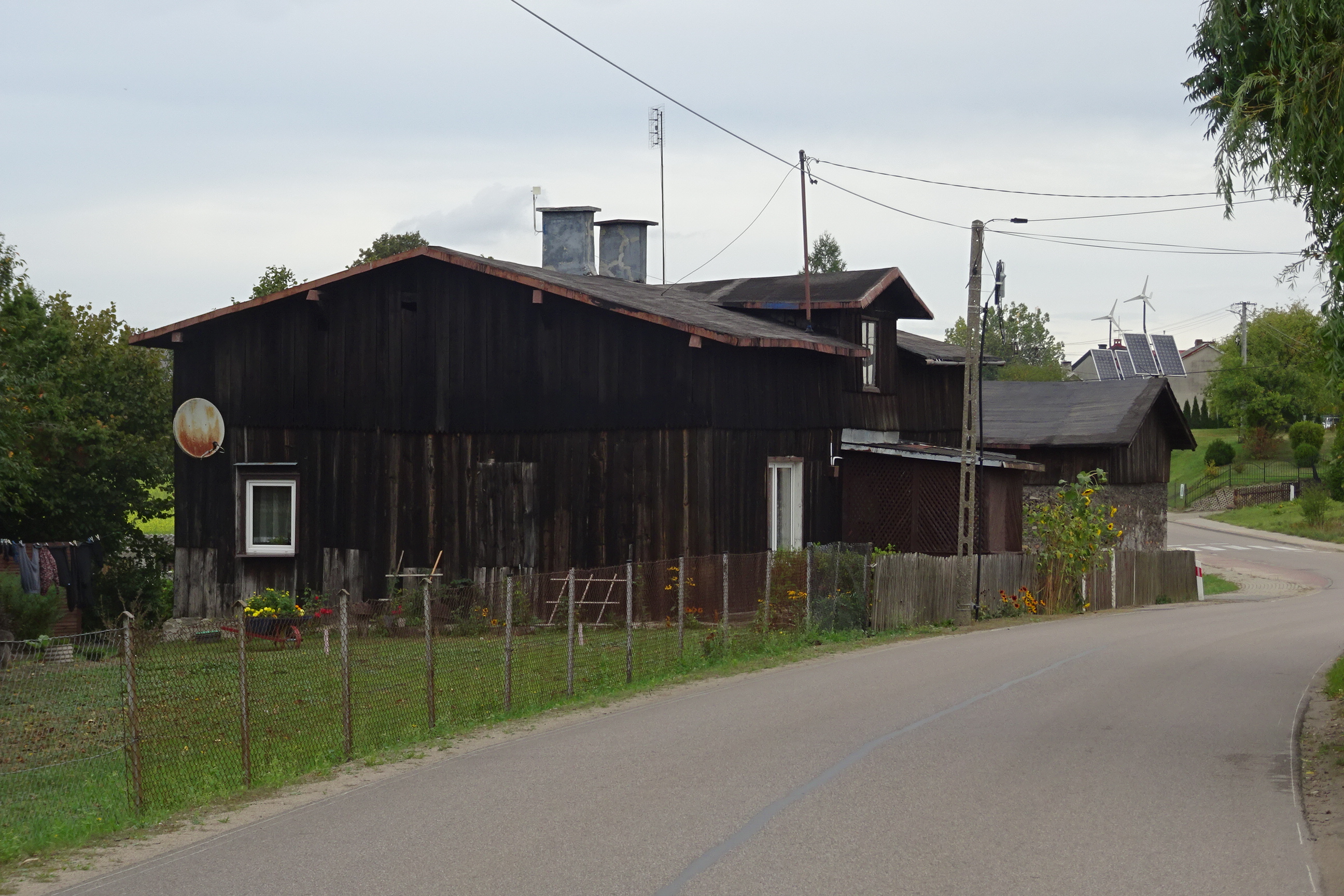

- Location within Poland
- Coordinates: 53°14′N 19°48′E
- Country: Poland
- Voivodeship: Warmian-Masurian
- County: Działdowo
- Gmina: Lidzbark

Population (approx.)
  - Total: 400
- Time zone: UTC+1 (CET)
  - Summer (DST): UTC+2 (CEST)

Jamielnik [jaˈmjɛlnik] is a village in the administrative district of Gmina Lidzbark, within Działdowo County, Warmian-Masurian Voivodeship, in northern Poland.
