= Rutkowice, Warmian-Masurian Voivodeship =

Rutkowice
- Village
- Location within Poland
- Coordinates: 53°17′N 20°6′E
- Country: Poland
- Voivodeship: Warmian-Masurian
- County: Działdowo
- Gmina: Płośnica

Rutkowice [rutkɔˈvit͡sɛ] is a village in the administrative district of Gmina Płośnica, within Działdowo County, Warmian-Masurian Voivodeship, in northern Poland.
