= Gralewo Stacja =

- Village
- Location within Poland
- Coordinates: 53°19′14″N 20°02′10″E
- Country: Poland
- Voivodeship: Warmian-Masurian
- County: Działdowo
- Gmina: Rybno

Gralewo Stacja [ɡraˈlɛvɔ ˈstat͡sja] is a village in the administrative district of Gmina Rybno, within Działdowo County, Warmian-Masurian Voivodeship, in northern Poland.
