= Bryńsk-Ostrowy =

- Village
- Location within Poland
- Coordinates: 53°12′50″N 19°45′38″E
- Country: Poland
- Voivodeship: Warmian-Masurian
- County: Działdowo
- Gmina: Lidzbark

Bryńsk-Ostrowy (Polish pronunciation: [brɨj̃sk ɔsˈtrɔvɨ]) is a village in the administrative district of Gmina Lidzbark, within Działdowo County, Warmian-Masurian Voivodeship, in northern Poland.
