= Borówno, Warmian-Masurian Voivodeship =

Village in Gmina Lidzbark, Poland

Borówno
- Village
- Location within Poland
- Coordinates: 53°12′18″N 19°47′37″E
- Country: Poland
- Voivodeship: Warmian-Masurian
- County: Działdowo
- Gmina: Lidzbark

Borówno [bɔˈruvnɔ] is a village in the administrative district of Gmina Lidzbark, within Działdowo County, Warmian-Masurian Voivodeship, in northern Poland.
