= Nowy Dwór-Leśniczówka =

- Village
- Location within Poland
- Coordinates: 53°14′17″N 19°50′30″E
- Country: Poland
- Voivodeship: Warmian-Masurian
- County: Działdowo
- Gmina: Lidzbark

Nowy Dwór-Leśniczówka (Polish pronunciation: [ˈnɔvɨ ˈdvur lɛɕɲiˈtʂufka]) is a village in the administrative district of Gmina Lidzbark, within Działdowo County, Warmian-Masurian Voivodeship, in northern Poland.
