= Nowe Dłutowo =

- Village
- Location within Poland
- Coordinates: 53°11′8″N 19°57′52″E
- Country: Poland
- Voivodeship: Warmian-Masurian
- County: Działdowo
- Gmina: Lidzbark

Nowe Dłutowo [ˈnɔvɛ dwuˈtɔvɔ] is a village in the administrative district of Gmina Lidzbark, within Działdowo County, Warmian-Masurian Voivodeship, in northern Poland.
