= Dębień, Działdowo County =

Dębień
- Village
- Location within Poland
- Coordinates: 53°23′N 19°54′E
- Country: Poland
- Voivodeship: Warmian-Masurian
- County: Działdowo
- Gmina: Rybno
- Population: 316

Dębień [ˈdɛmbjɛɲ] is a village in the administrative district of Gmina Rybno, within Działdowo County, Warmian-Masurian Voivodeship, in northern Poland.
