= Ostrowy, Działdowo County =

Ostrowy
- Settlement
- Location within Poland
- Coordinates: 53°13′N 19°46′E
- Country: Poland
- Voivodeship: Warmian-Masurian
- County: Działdowo
- Gmina: Lidzbark

Ostrowy [ɔsˈtrɔvɨ] is a settlement in the administrative district of Gmina Lidzbark, within Działdowo County, Warmian-Masurian Voivodeship, in northern Poland.
