= Roman Antoszewski =

- Born: 20 January 1935; Lidzbark Welski, Poland
- Died: 27 November 2017 (aged 82); Laingholm, Titirangi, Auckland, New Zealand
- Occupation: Professor in Natural Sciences
- Awards: Order of Polonia Restituta; Silver Cross of Merit
- Website: www.antoranz.net

Roman Antoszewski (20 January 1935 – 27 November 2017) was a professor in plant physiology, born in Lidzbark Welski, Poland.

== Publications ==
- Translated into Polish Red runs the Vistula ISBN 978-0908734009 ASIN: B0007BQDNU (1985) English historical book of Ron Jeffery - Nevron Associates Publ., Manurewa, Auckland;
- Novel "Kariera na trzy karpie morskie", Warszawa 2000; ISBN 83-7236-115-0
- Przyroda inaczej... czyli Ciekawostki; ISBN 83-87297-25-9
- Dziwy i dziwadła obyczajowe ... czyli Ciekawostki; ISBN 83-87297-27-5
- Historia inaczej ... czyli Ciekawostki - Kraków 2000; ISBN 83-87297-26-7
- Zbiór wiadomości niezwykłych, szokujących, mądrych, choć nie zawsze - Auckland 1995;
- Dziwy i dziwadła - Cinderella Books Warszawa 2001; ISBN 83-86245-97-2
- Few handbook for classes, University of the West Indies, 1985, 1986
- Article in: Analytica Chimica Acta - "A simple and rapid determination of small amounts of adenine The Analyst Volume: 85, Issue 1012, 1960 / 37, Issue 1, 1960 / 22, Issue C, 1960
- Article in: Biochemical and Biophysical Research Communications, Volume 43, Issue 1, 2 April 1971 "Peroxidase biosynthesis in pea roots as influenced by IAA treatment" BBRC article
- Cited - Brazhnikov, V.V. "Gas chromatography for space research" Chromatographia 1970
- Article in: Journal of Chromatography - "Homogenization and extraction of biological material for chromatographic purposes" 1959
- Atticle in: Die Naturwissenschaften - "Mikroextraktor für biochemische und chromatographische Zwecke" 1958
