= Zalesie, Gmina Płośnica =

Zalesie
- Village
- Location within Poland
- Coordinates: 53°9′34″N 20°0′48″E
- Country: Poland
- Voivodeship: Warmian-Masurian
- County: Działdowo
- Gmina: Płośnica

Zalesie [zaˈlɛɕɛ] is a village in the administrative district of Gmina Płośnica, within Działdowo County, Warmian-Masurian Voivodeship, in northern Poland.

From 1975 to 1998, Zalesie was administratively part of Ciechanów Voivodeship.
