= Klonowo, Działdowo County =

Klonowo
- Village
- Location within Poland
- Coordinates: 53°14′N 19°45′E
- Country: Poland
- Voivodeship: Warmian-Masurian
- County: Działdowo
- Gmina: Lidzbark
- Population (approx.): 270

Klonowo [klɔˈnɔvɔ] is a village in the administrative district of Gmina Lidzbark, within Działdowo County, Warmian-Masurian Voivodeship, in northern Poland.
