= Gmina Rybno, Warmian-Masurian Voivodeship =

Gmina Rybno Rybno Commune
- Gmina
- Coat of arms
- Interactive map of Gmina Rybno
- Coordinates (Rybno): 53°22′57″N 19°55′40″E
- Country: Poland
- Voivodeship: Warmian-Masurian
- County: Działdowo
- Seat: Rybno

Area
  - Total: 147.46 km^{2} (56.93 sq mi)

Population (2011)
  - Total: 7,384
  - Density: 50.07/km^{2} (129.7/sq mi)
- Website: http://www.rybno.ug.gov.pl/

Gmina Rybno is a rural gmina (administrative district) in Działdowo County, Warmian-Masurian Voivodeship, in northern Poland. Its seat is the village of Rybno, which lies approximately 24 kilometres (15 mi) north-west of Działdowo and 59 km (37 mi) south-west of the regional capital Olsztyn.

The gmina covers an area of 147.46 square kilometres (56.9 sq mi), and as of 2006 its total population consists of 7,258 people (7,384 in 2011).

== Villages ==
Gmina Rybno contains the villages and settlements of Dębień, Grabacz, Grądy, Gralewo Stacja, Gronowo, Groszki, Hartowiec, Jeglia, Kopaniarze, Kostkowo, Koszelewki, Koszelewy, Lesiak, Naguszewo, Nowa Wieś, Prusy, Rapaty, Rumian, Rybno, Szczupliny, Truszczyny, Tuczki, Wery and Żabiny.

== Neighbouring gminas ==
Gmina Rybno is bordered by the gminas of Dąbrówno, Działdowo, Grodziczno, Lidzbark, Lubawa and Płośnica.
