= Płośnica =

- Village
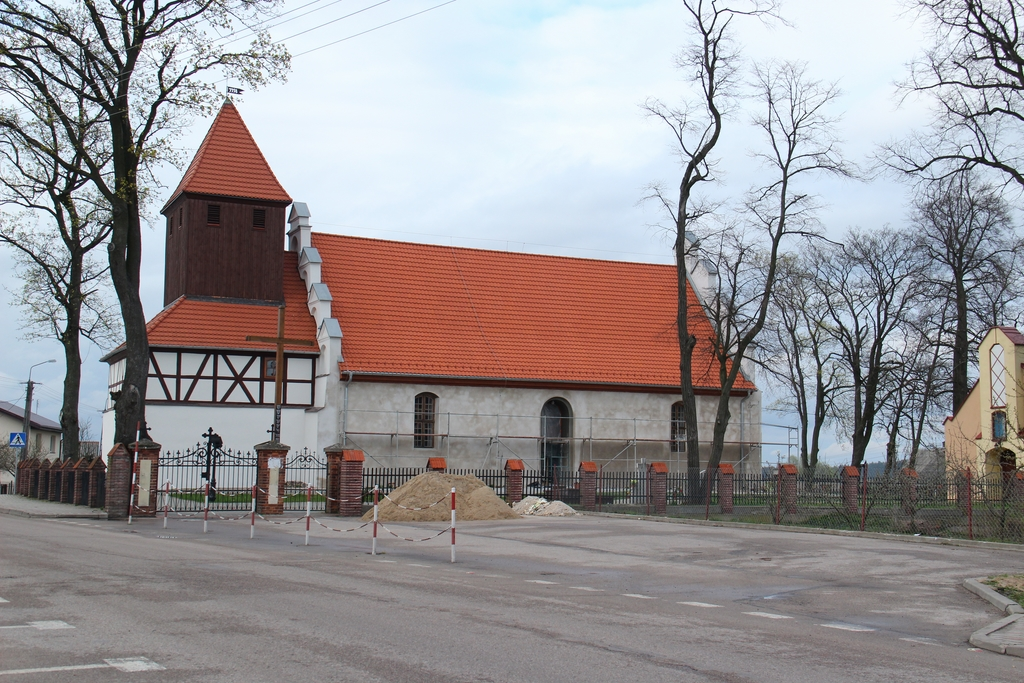
- Saint Barbara church in Płośnica

- Location within Poland
- Coordinates: 53°17′N 20°1′E
- Country: Poland
- Voivodeship: Warmian-Masurian
- County: Działdowo
- Gmina: Płośnica
- Population: 990
- Time zone: UTC+1 (CET)
  - Summer (DST): UTC+2 (CEST)
- Vehicle registration: NDZ

Płośnica [pwɔɕˈnit͡sa] is a village in Działdowo County, Warmian-Masurian Voivodeship, in northern Poland. It is the seat of the gmina (administrative district) called Gmina Płośnica. It is located in Masuria.

== History ==
Płośnica was first documented in 1351, while its church was first reported in 1404. In 1454, King Casimir IV Jagiellon incorporated the region to the Kingdom of Poland upon the request of the Prussian Confederation. After the subsequent Thirteen Years' War (1454–1466), it became a part of Poland as a fief held by the Teutonic Knights. The village was inhabited by Poles for centuries, and as of 1547 its population was solely Polish. From the 18th century it was part of the Kingdom of Prussia. In 1818 it belonged to Landkreis Neidenburg (Nidzica) in the province of East Prussia, and from 1871 it formed part of the German Empire. In the late 19th century, the village had a population of over 1,000, Polish by ethnicity and mostly living off farming.

It was damaged during World War I and became again part of Poland in 1920 after the Treaty of Versailles. At the beginning of World War II in 1939 it was invaded by Germany and then occupied until 1945, when it was overrun by the Soviet Red Army and restored to Poland.
