= Lake Lidzbark =

Lake in Lidzbark Welski, Poland

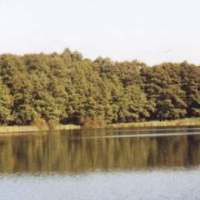

- Location within Warmian-Masurian Voivodeship
- Location: Masurian Lake District
- Coordinates: 53°15′30″N 19°47′40″E
- Basin countries: Poland
- Surface area: 122 ha (300 acres)
- Settlements: Lidzbark Welski

Lake Lidzbark (Polish: Jezioro Lidzbarskie, German: Lautenburger See) is a lake in Masurian Lake District of Warmian–Masurian Voivodeship of Poland. Lidzbark Welski, a town, lies at the confluence of the lake and the River Wel.
