= Zdrojek, Działdowo County =

Zdrojek
- Village
- Location within Poland
- Coordinates: 53°13′N 19°57′E
- Country: Poland
- Voivodeship: Warmian-Masurian
- County: Działdowo
- Gmina: Lidzbark

Zdrojek [ˈzdrɔjɛk] is a village in the administrative district of Gmina Lidzbark, within Działdowo County, Warmian-Masurian Voivodeship, in northern Poland.
