= Zálesie =

Zálesie may refer to:

- Zálesie, Kežmarok District, Slovakia
- Zálesie, Senec District, Slovakia

== See also ==
- Zalesie (disambiguation)
- Zalesye
