= Lidzbark-Nadleśnictwo =

- Settlement
- Location within Poland
- Coordinates: 53°14′N 19°46′E
- Country: Poland
- Voivodeship: Warmian-Masurian
- County: Działdowo
- Gmina: Lidzbark

Lidzbark-Nadleśnictwo [ˈlid͡zbark nadlɛɕˈnit͡stfɔ] is a settlement in the administrative district of Gmina Lidzbark, within Działdowo County, Warmian-Masurian Voivodeship, in northern Poland.
