= Gmina Płośnica =

Gmina Płośnica Płośnica Commune
- Gmina
- Interactive map of Gmina Płośnica
- Coordinates (Płośnica): 53°17′N 20°1′E
- Country: Poland
- Voivodeship: Warmian-Masurian
- County: Działdowo
- Seat: Płośnica

Area
  - Total: 163.09 km^{2} (62.97 sq mi)

Population (2011)
  - Total: 5,924
  - Density: 36.32/km^{2} (94.08/sq mi)

Gmina Płośnica is a rural gmina (administrative district) in Działdowo County, Warmian-Masurian Voivodeship, in northern Poland. Its seat is the village of Płośnica, which lies approximately 13 kilometres (8 mi) north-west of Działdowo and 65 km (40 mi) south-west of the regional capital Olsztyn.

The gmina covers an area of 163.09 square kilometres (63.0 sq mi), and as of 2006 its total population is 5,896 (5,924 in 2011).

The gmina contains part of the protected area called Wel Landscape Park.

== Villages ==
Gmina Płośnica contains the villages and settlements of Gralewo, Gródki, Gruszka, Jabłonowo, Mały Łęck, Murawki, Niechłonin, Płośnica, Prioma, Przełęk Duży, Rutkowice, Skurpie, Turza Mała, Wielki Łęck and Zalesie.

== Neighbouring gminas ==
Gmina Płośnica is bordered by the gminas of Działdowo, Kuczbork-Osada, Lidzbark and Rybno.
