= Rybno, Działdowo County =

Rybno
- Village
- Location within Poland
- Coordinates: 53°22′N 19°55′E
- Country: Poland
- Voivodeship: Warmian-Masurian
- County: Działdowo
- Gmina: Rybno
- Population: 2,558

Rybno [ˈrɨbnɔ] is a village in Działdowo County, Warmian-Masurian Voivodeship, in northern Poland. It is the seat of the gmina (administrative district) called Gmina Rybno.
