= Zalesie, Gmina Lidzbark =

Zalesie
- Village
- Location within Poland
- Coordinates: 53°17′40″N 19°43′57″E
- Country: Poland
- Voivodeship: Warmian-Masurian
- County: Działdowo
- Gmina: Lidzbark

Zalesie [zaˈlɛɕɛ] is a village in the administrative district of Gmina Lidzbark, within Działdowo County, Warmian-Masurian Voivodeship, in northern Poland.
