= Great Dąbrowa =

Lake in Poland

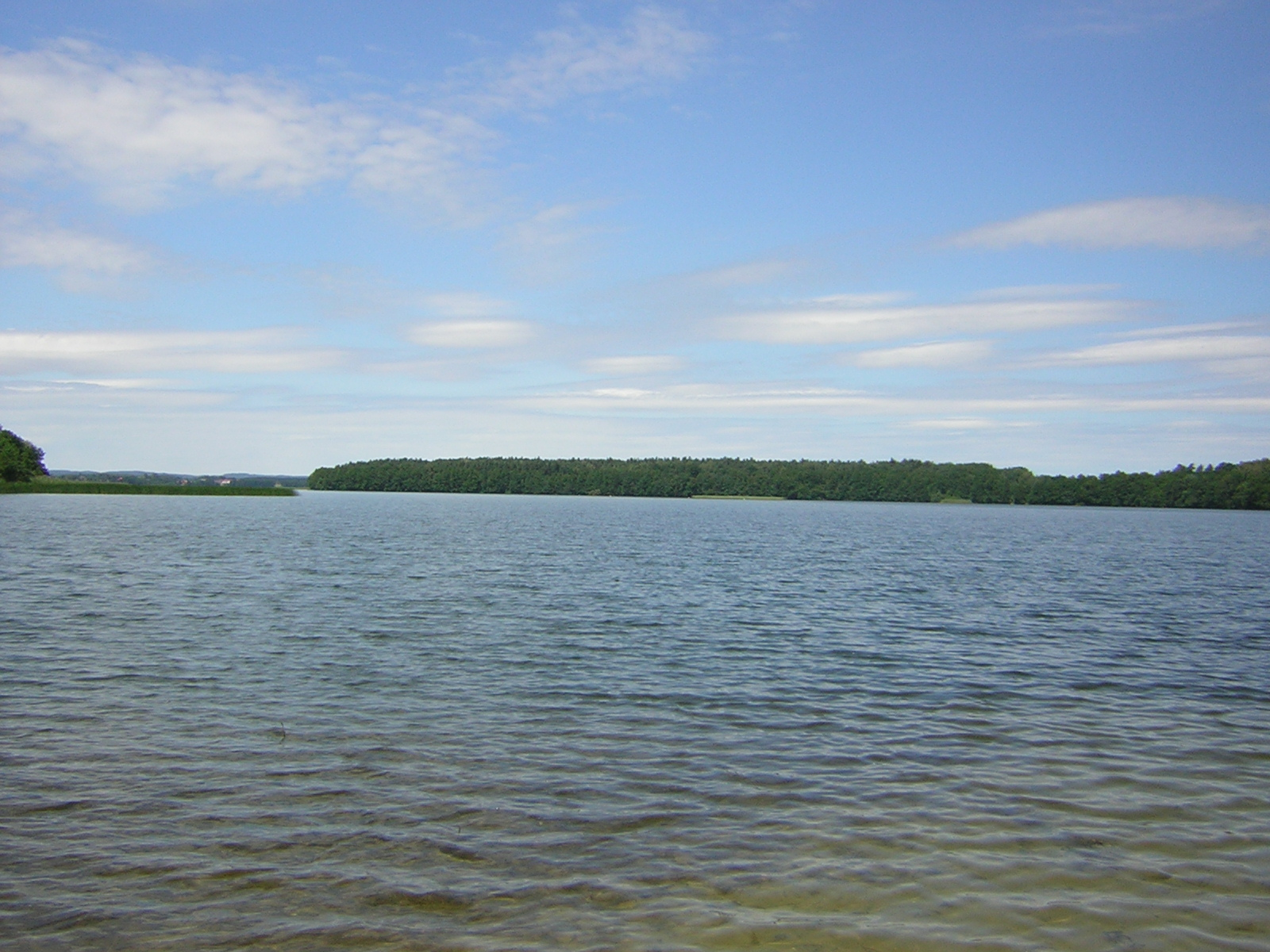

- Location within Poland
- Coordinates: 53°26′16″N 20°3′0″E
- Basin countries: Poland
- Max. length: 6.4 km (4.0 mi)
- Max. width: 1.4 km (0.87 mi)
- Surface area: 6.16 km^{2} (2.38 sq mi)
- Average depth: 8 m (26 ft)
- Max. depth: 35 m (115 ft)

The Great Dąbrowa (Polish: Jezioro Dąbrowa Wielka, German: Groß Damerau See) is a lake in Poland near the gmina Dąbrówno. The Little Dąbrowa lake is nearby.
