= Zaļesje Parish =

Parish of Latvia

- parish of Latvia
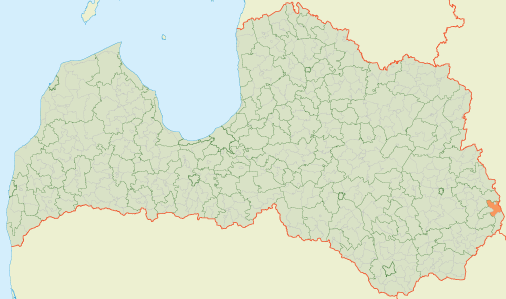
- 56°21′15″N 28°06′10″E
- Country: Latvia

Area
  - Total: 108.76 km^{2} (41.99 sq mi)
  - Land: 107.05 km^{2} (41.33 sq mi)
  - Water: 1.71 km^{2} (0.66 sq mi)

Population (1 January 2024)
  - Total: 477
  - Density: 4.4/km^{2} (11/sq mi)

Zaļesje Parish (Latvian: Zaļesjes pagasts) is an administrative unit of Ludza Municipality in the Latgale region of Latvia, its administrative center being the village of Zaļesje.

The place is close to the border with Russia, and the name of the village is a common Russian toponym meaning "place over the woods".

By the 2009 administrative reform, this territorial unit was merged into the Zilupe Municipality. Since 1 July 2021, Zaļesje Parish has been part of Ludza Municipality.
