= Dąbrówno =

- Village
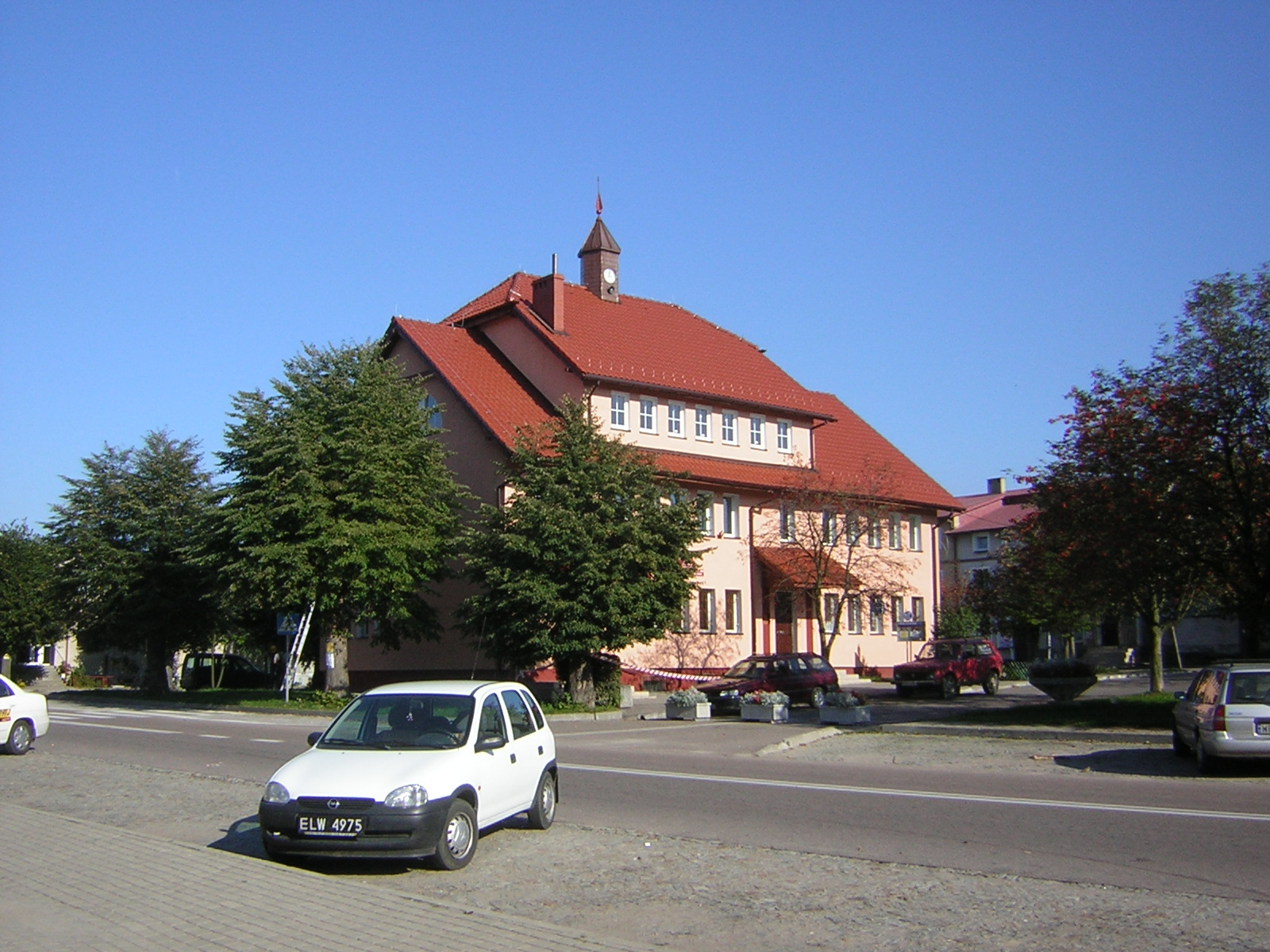
- Gmina office in Dąbrówno

- Location within Poland
- Coordinates: 53°26′N 20°2′E
- Country: Poland
- Voivodeship: Warmian-Masurian
- County: Ostróda
- Gmina: Dąbrówno
- granting city rights: 1325
- deprivation of city rights: 1945
- Population: 1,400
- Time zone: UTC+1 (CET)
  - Summer (DST): UTC+2 (CEST)
- Vehicle registration: NOS
- Website: http://www.dabrowno.pl

Dąbrówno [dɔmˈbruvnɔ] is a village and the seat of a gmina (municipality) in Ostróda County, Warmian-Masurian Voivodeship in northern Poland. It is located within the ethnographic region of Masuria.

== History ==
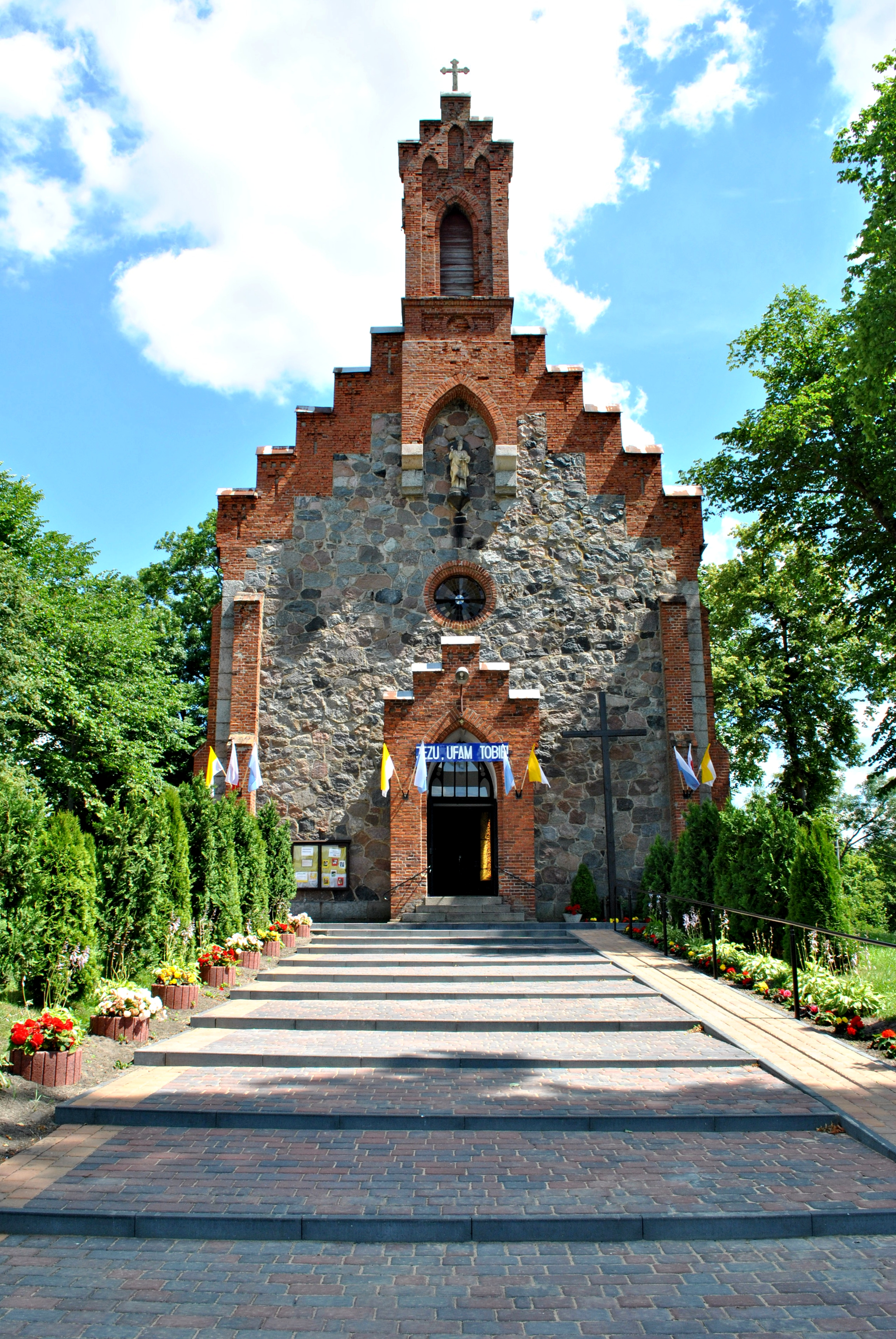
Saint John of Nepomuk church

By the 13th century the Old Prussians had constructed a fort on a narrow between the Great and Little Dąbrowa lakes. Following the Prussian Crusade, the Teutonic Order began fortifying the area as Gilgenburg in 1316, and the developing settlement received its town charter in 1326. During the 15th century, it was repeatedly destroyed through warfare. In 1410, during the Polish–Lithuanian–Teutonic War, the town was captured and destroyed by polish forces; through geophysical surveys, polish archaeologists have now rediscovered the lost remains of this medieval settlement, including its central marketplace. In 1444, the town joined the anti-Teutonic Prussian Confederation, upon the request of which Polish King Casimir IV Jagiellon incorporated the region and town to the Kingdom of Poland in 1454. After the subsequent Thirteen Years' War, the longest of all Polish–Teutonic wars, the region and town became part of Poland as a fief held by the Teutonic Knights.

From the 18th century, the town was part of the Kingdom of Prussia, within which it was included in the Landkreis Osterode in Ostpreußen (Ostróda County) in 1818. In 1871, it also became part of Germany, within which it was located in the province of East Prussia. Despite being on the railway between Osterode (Ostróda) and Soldau (Działdowo), it remained a tiny town with no more than 1,000 residents. After the nearby town of Działdowo was reintegrated with the reborn Polish state following World War I, and thus separated from the province of East Prussia, Dąbrówno became the southernmost town of the Masurian Oberland and was cut off from its regional connections.

The town was heavily damaged during World War II, after which it became again part of Poland. Because much of its medieval layout still exists, including its church and part of its fortifications, Dąbrówno began to be reconstructed during the 1990s.

== Notable people ==
- Jerzy Skrodzki (1635–1682), Polish religious writer, translator and pastor
- Otto Brodde (1910-1982), German musician
