= Little Dąbrowa =

Lake in Warmian Masurian Voivodeship, Poland

- Location within Poland
- Coordinates: 53°26′36″N 20°1′20″E
- Basin countries: Poland

The Little Dąbrowa (Polish: Jezioro Dąbrowa Mała, German: Klein Damerau See) is a lake in Poland near the gmina Dąbrówno. The Great Dąbrowa lake is nearby.
