= Zaļesje =

Village in Latvia

- Vidējciems
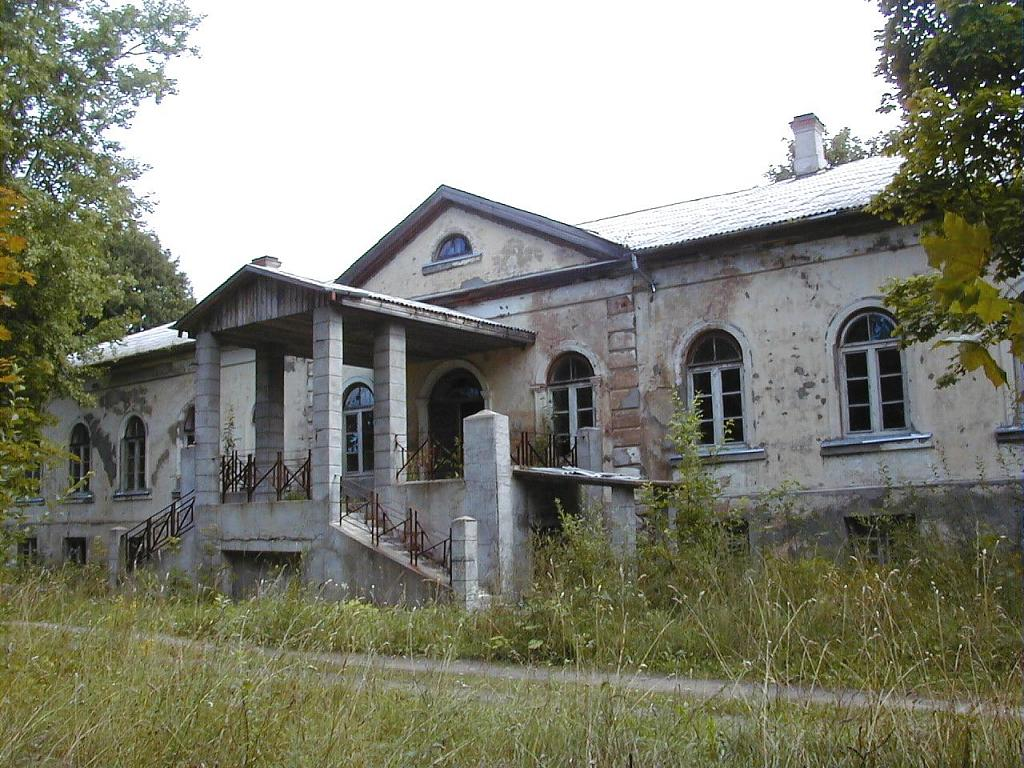
- Zaļesje Manor

- Location within Latvia
- Coordinates: 56°20′14″N 28°8′30″E
- Country: Latvia
- Municipality: Ludza Municipality
- Parish: Zaļesje Parish

Area
  - Total: 0,377 km^{2} (146 sq mi)
- Elevation: 125 m (410 ft)

Population (2021)
  - Total: 86
  - Density: 0.23/km^{2} (0.59/sq mi)
- Post office: LV-5705 Aizsili

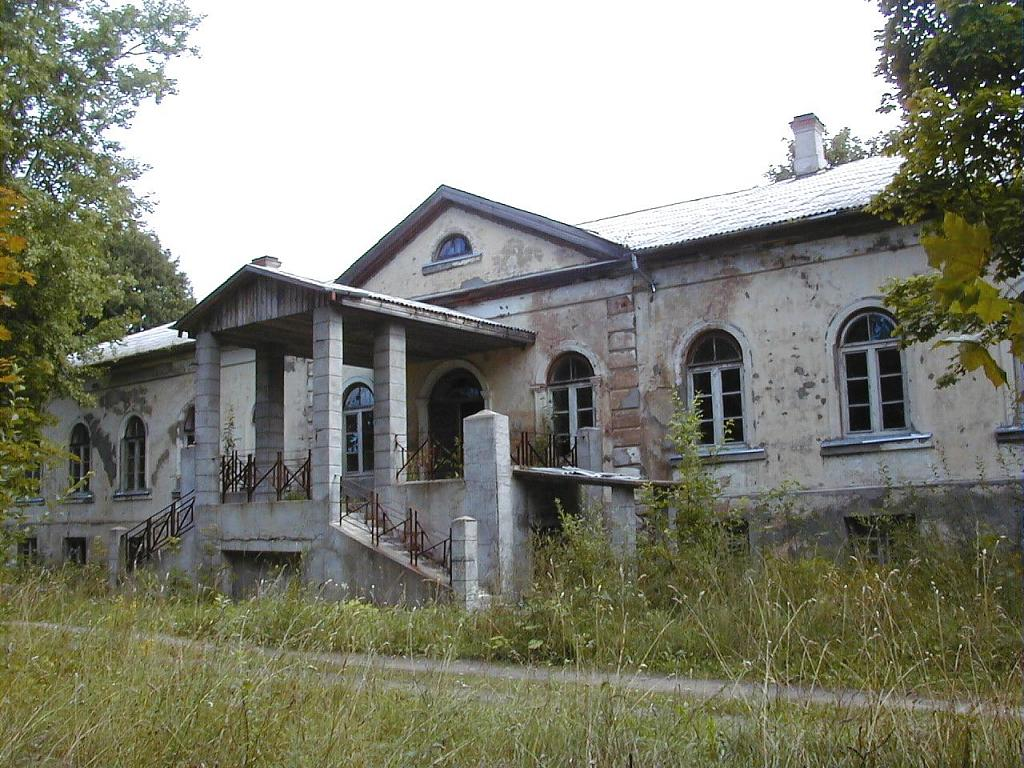
An abandoned manor in the area

Zaļesje is a village in Ludza Municipality in the historical region of Latgale in Latvia. Zaļesje is the centre of Zaļesje Parish.
