= Gmina Lidzbark =

Gmina Lidzbark Lidzbark Commune
- Gmina
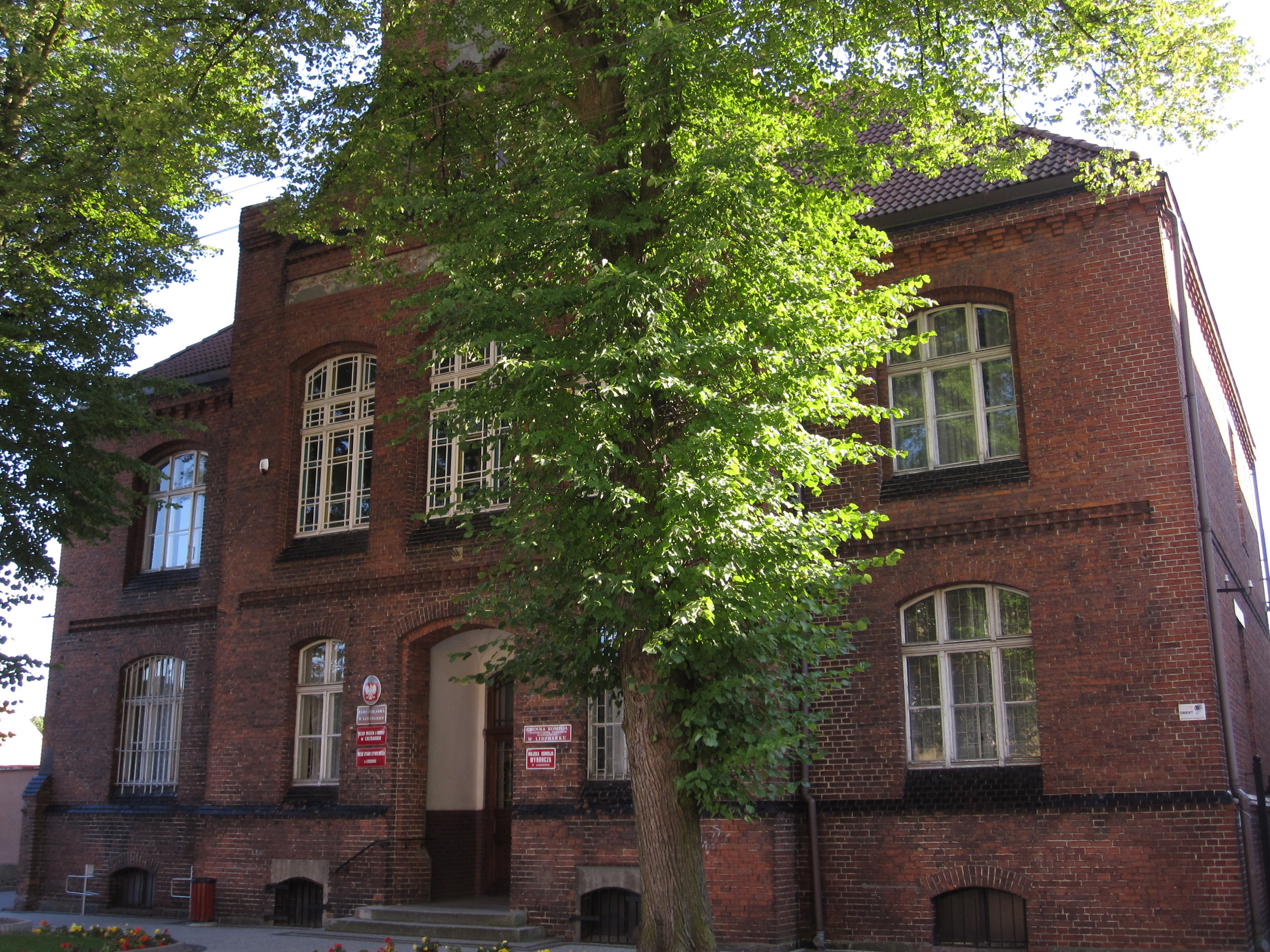
- Gmina office in Lidzbark

- Flag Coat of arms
- Interactive map of Gmina Lidzbark
- Coordinates (Lidzbark): 53°15′37″N 19°49′16″E
- Country: Poland
- Voivodeship: Warmian-Masurian
- County: Działdowo
- Seat: Lidzbark

Area
  - Total: 255.67 km^{2} (98.71 sq mi)

Population (2011)
  - Total: 14,710
  - Density: 57.54/km^{2} (149.0/sq mi)
  - Urban: 8,234
  - Rural: 6,476
- Time zone: UTC+1 (CET)
  - Summer (DST): UTC+2 (CEST)
- Vehicle registration: NDZ
- Website: http://www.lidzbarkwelski.bil-wm.pl/

Gmina Lidzbark is an urban-rural gmina (administrative district) in Działdowo County, Warmian-Masurian Voivodeship, in northern Poland. Its seat is the town of Lidzbark, which lies approximately 25 kilometres (16 mi) west of Działdowo and 74 km (46 mi) south-west of the regional capital Olsztyn. (This should not be confused with Lidzbark Warmiński, another town in Warmian-Masurian Voivodeship).

The gmina covers an area of 255.67 square kilometres (98.7 sq mi), and as of 2006 its total population is 14,484 (out of which the population of Lidzbark amounts to 8,261, and the population of the rural part of the gmina is 6,223).

The gmina contains parts of the protected areas called Górzno-Lidzbark Landscape Park and Wel Landscape Park.

== Villages ==
Apart from the town of Lidzbark, Gmina Lidzbark contains the villages and settlements of Adamowo, Bełk, Biernaty, Bladowo, Borki, Borówno, Bryńsk, Bryńsk Szlachecki, Bryńsk-Ostrowy, Chełsty, Cibórz, Ciechanówko, Dębowiec, Glinki, Jamielnik, Jeleń, Kiełpiny, Klonowo, Koty, Kurojady, Lidzbark-Nadleśnictwo, Marszewnica, Miłostajki, Nick, Nowe Dłutowo, Nowy Dwór, Nowy Dwór-Leśniczówka, Nowy Zieluń, Olszewo, Ostrowy, Piaseczno, Podcibórz, Sarnia Góra, Słup, Stare Dłutowo, Tarczyny, Wąpiersk, Wawrowo, Wlewsk, Zalesie, Zdrojek and Zielonka.

== Neighbouring gminas ==
Gmina Lidzbark is bordered by the gminas of Bartniczka, Brzozie, Górzno, Grodziczno, Lubowidz, Płośnica and Rybno.
