= Rumyan Castle =

Castle in Lorestan Province, Iran

Rumyan castle
- قلعه رومیان
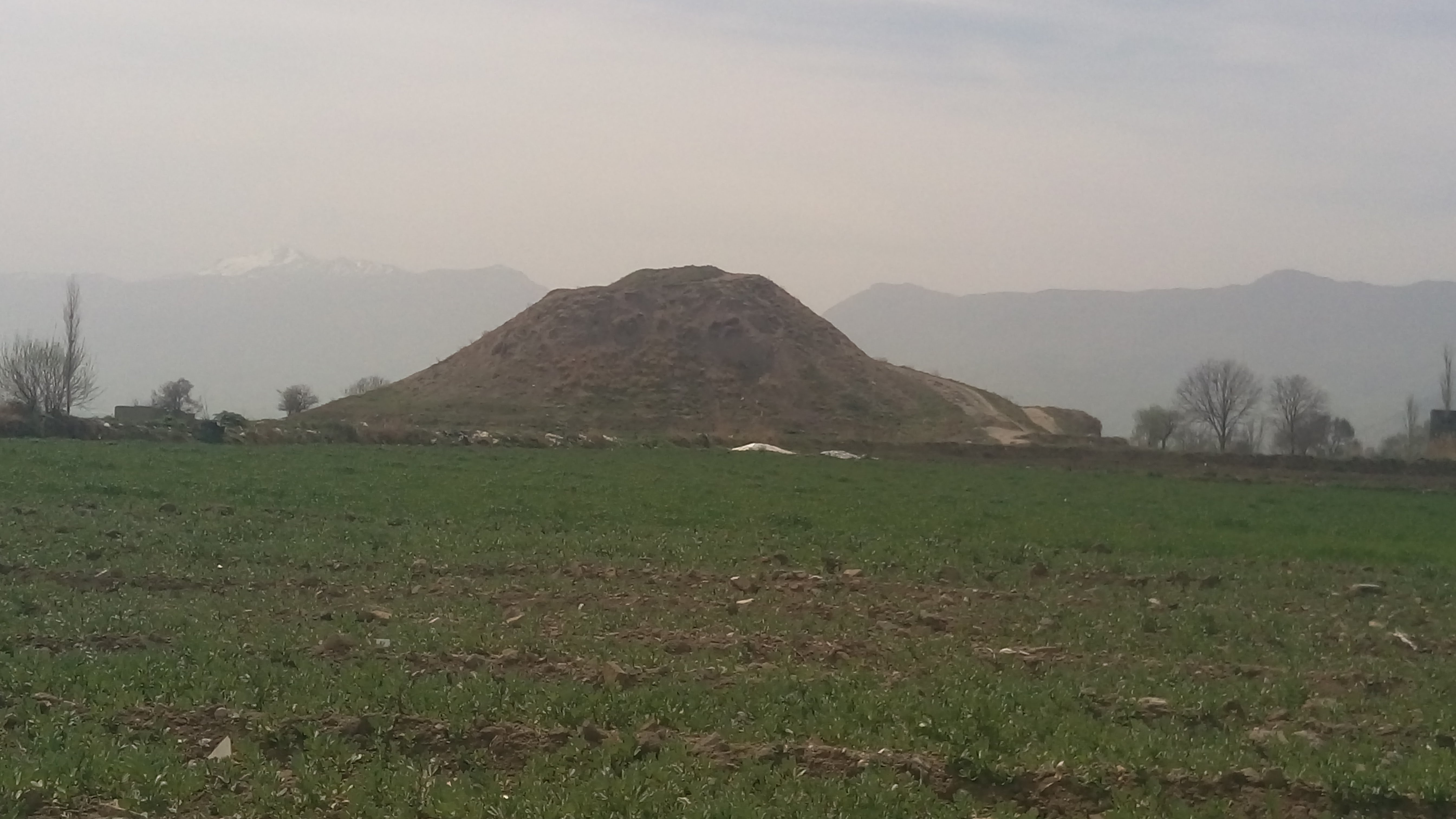

General information
- Type: Castle
- Location: Borujerd County, Iran

Rumyan castle (Persian: قلعه رومیان) is a historical castle located in Borujerd County in Lorestan Province. The longevity of this fortress dates back to the Prehistoric times of ancient Iran.
