= Lidzbark =

Town in Warmian–Masurian Voivodeship, Poland

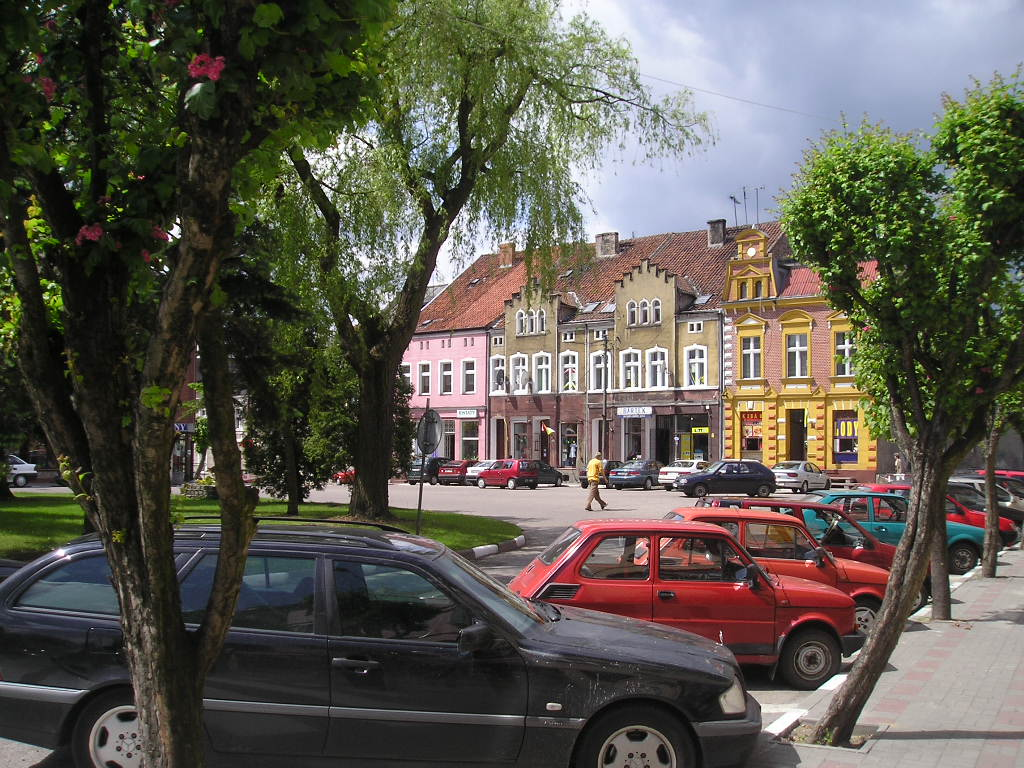
- Haller Town Square in Lidzbark

- Flag Coat of arms

- Location within Poland
- Coordinates: 53°15′37″N 19°49′16″E
- Country: Poland
- Voivodeship: Warmian–Masurian
- County: Działdowo
- Gmina: Lidzbark

Area
  - Total: 5.7 km^{2} (2.2 sq mi)

Population (2025)
  - Total: 7,152
  - Density: 1,300/km^{2} (3,200/sq mi)
- Time zone: UTC+1 (CET)
  - Summer (DST): UTC+2 (CEST)
- Postal code: 13-230
- Website: http://www.lidzbark.pl

Lidzbark ([ˈlʲid͡zbark]; German: Lautenburg) is a town with 7,152 (2025) inhabitants in the Warmian–Masurian Voivodeship in north-central Poland. It is located on the Wel river and Lake Lidzbark. The town is popularly referred to as Lidzbark Welski (of the Wel), to distinguish it from Lidzbark Warmiński (of Warmia).

Lidzbark is a member of Cittaslow.

== History ==
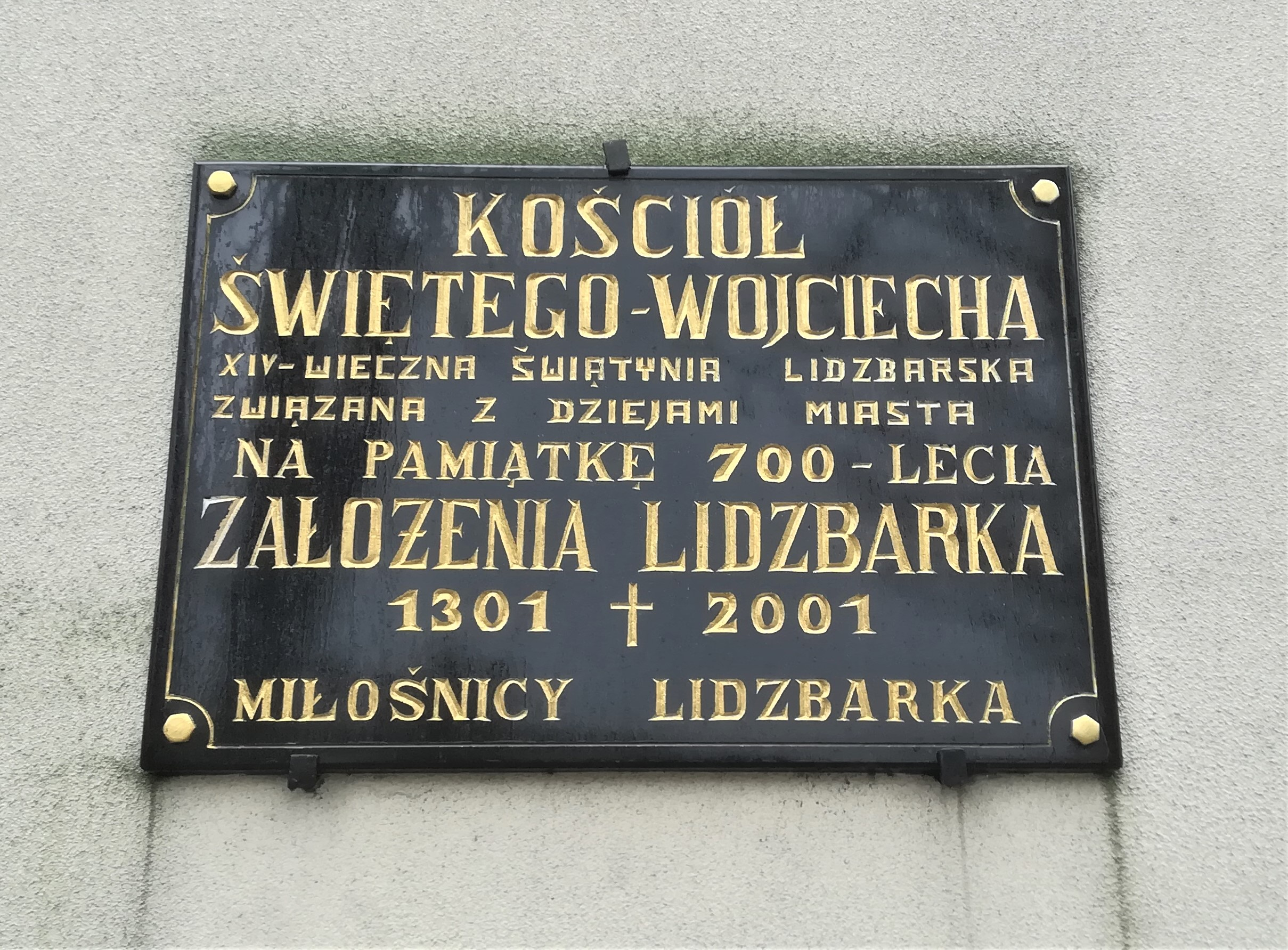
Plaque commemorating the 700th anniversary of the founding of Lidzbark

Lidzbark was founded in 1301, under the Teutonic Order. The town's Roman Catholic parish church was constructed in 1350.

Władysław II Jagiełło led his army through Lidzbark on July 9, 1410, before the Battle of Grunwald. The town in the process was torched and plundered by Lithuanian-Tatar armies. On September 29, 1413, some of the Teutonic Knights in the town revolted against Heinrich von Plauen the Elder; they were only appeased with Plauen's replacement with Michael Küchmeister von Sternberg. The town joined the Prussian Confederation, which opposed Teutonic rule, and upon the request of which King Casimir IV Jagiellon reincorporated the territory to the Kingdom of Poland in 1454. On 28 May 1454 Lidzbark pledged allegiance to the Polish King in Toruń. At the Second Peace of Thorn (1466) the Teutonic Knights renounced claims to the town and recognized it as part of Poland. Administratively it was located in the Chełmno Voivodeship in the province of Royal Prussia in the Greater Poland Province. A large portion of the town was destroyed by fire in 1764.

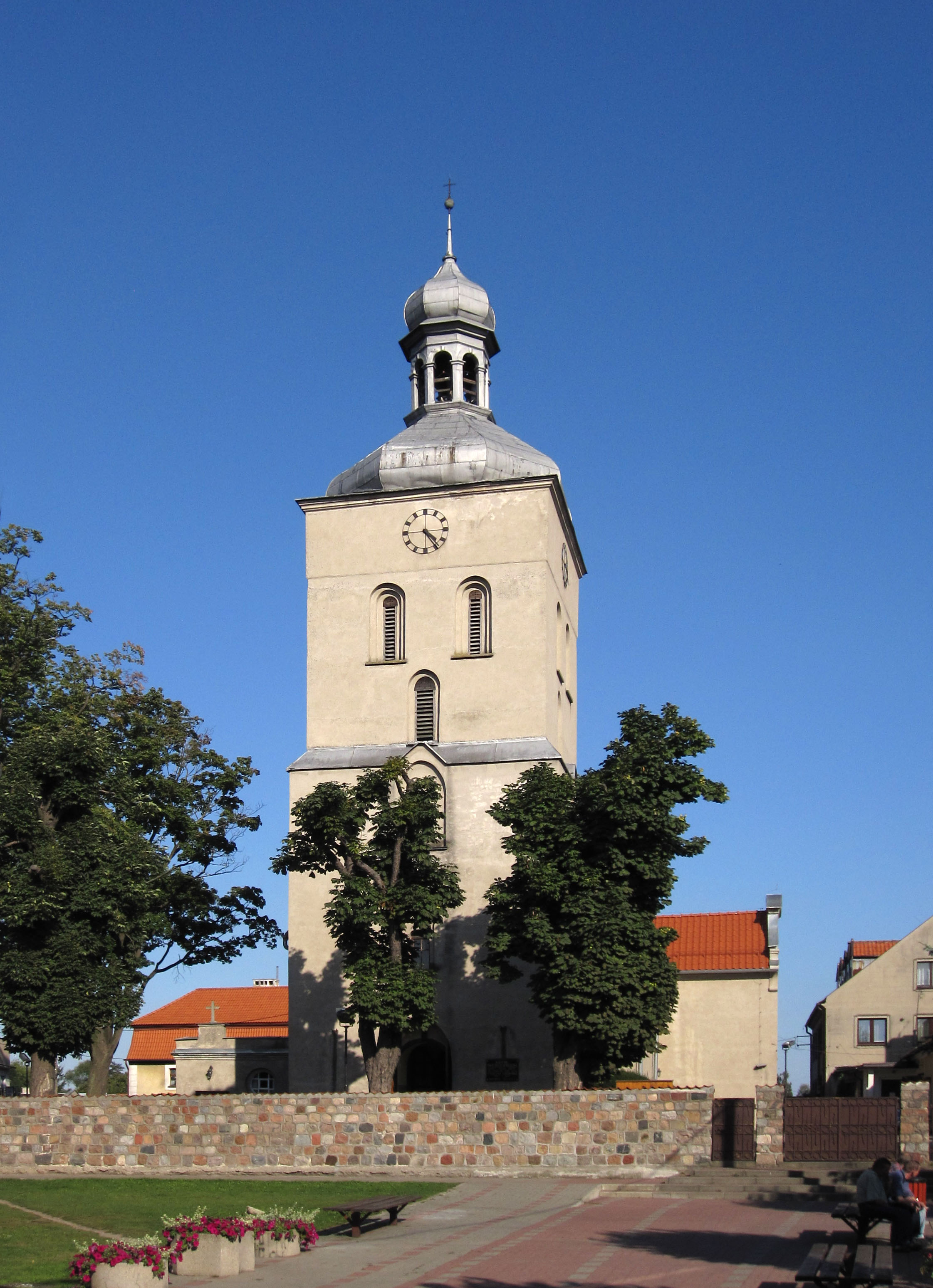
Saint Adalbert church from the 18th century

During the First Partition of Poland, the town was annexed by the Kingdom of Prussia in 1772. In 1772, the town had 510 inhabitants and 83 timbered buildings. Agriculture was common in the area along with crafting. In 1789, the population reached 802 of which 41 families were craftsmen. During the Napoleonic Wars it was part of the Polish Duchy of Warsaw from 1807 to 1815, but was reannexed by Prussia afterwards. In the beginning of the 20th century, the town had breweries, sawmills, iron mill, engine works and dairy products. In 1920, the area was reintegrated with Poland after it regained independence.

Following the German-Soviet invasion of Poland, which started World War II in September 1939, Lidzbark was occupied by Germany until 1945. Three Polish policemen from Lidzbark were murdered by the Russians in the Katyn massacre in 1940. 70% of the town was destroyed during the war. In 1945, the town was restored to Poland, although with a Soviet-installed communist regime, which stayed in power until the 1980s. In the following years, the Polish anti-communist resistance was active in Lidzbark, including the nationwide Home Army Resistance Movement and the local Polish Catholic Youth Organization.

== Sports ==
The local football team is Wel Lidzbark, which competes in the lower leagues.

== Demographics ==
Historical population

Year	Pop.	±%
1880	3,820	—
1890	3,746	−1.9%
1900	3,593	−4.1%
1910	4,003	+11.4%
1921	3,325	−16.9%

Year	Pop.	±%
1931	4,032	+21.3%
1939	7,783	+93.0%
1950	3,508	−54.9%
1960	4,027	+14.8%
2010	8,131	+101.9%

== Twinnings ==
- Oebisfelde, Germany
- Co op municipality: Guttau, Germany
- Sovetsk, Kaliningrad Oblast, Russia

== Notable people ==
- Roman Antoszewski (1935–2017), plant physiologist
- David Orbansky (1843–1897), Union Army soldier in the American Civil War, Medal of Honor awardee.
