= Działdowo County =

Działdowo County Powiat działdowski
- County
- Flag Coat of arms

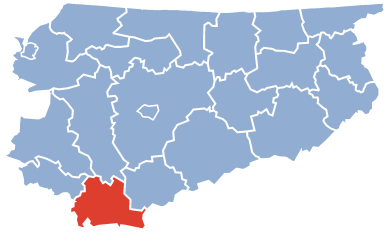
- Location within the voivodeship

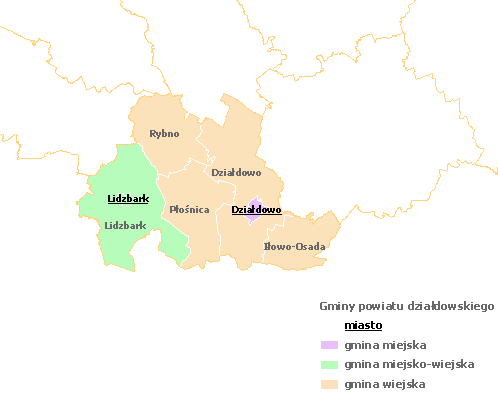
- Division into gminas
- Coordinates (Działdowo): 53°14′N 20°11′E
- Country: Poland
- Voivodeship: Warmian-Masurian
- Seat: Działdowo
- Gminas: Total 6 (incl. 1 urban): Działdowo; Gmina Działdowo; Gmina Iłowo-Osada; Gmina Lidzbark; Gmina Płośnica; Gmina Rybno

Area
  - Total: 953.18 km^{2} (368.02 sq mi)

Population (2019)
  - Total: 65,288
  - Density: 68.495/km^{2} (177.40/sq mi)
  - Urban: 29,073
  - Rural: 36,215
- Car plates: NDZ
- Website: www.powiatdzialdowski.pl

Działdowo County (Polish: powiat działdowski) is a unit of territorial administration and local government (powiat) in Warmian-Masurian Voivodeship, northern Poland. It came into being on January 1, 1999, as a result of the Polish local government reforms passed in 1998. Its administrative seat and largest town is Działdowo, which lies 65 kilometres (40 mi) south of the regional capital Olsztyn. The only other town in the county is Lidzbark, lying 25 km (16 mi) west of Działdowo. (This should not be confused with Lidzbark Warmiński, another town in Warmian-Masurian Voivodeship, which is the seat of Lidzbark County.)

The county covers an area of 953.18 square kilometres (368.0 sq mi). As of 2019 its total population is 65,288, out of which the population of Działdowo is 21,279, that of Lidzbark is 7,794, and the rural population is 36,215.

== Neighbouring counties ==
Działdowo County is bordered by Ostróda County to the north, Nidzica County to the north-east, Mława County to the south-east, Żuromin County to the south-west, Brodnica County and Nowe Miasto County to the west, and Iława County to the north-west.

== Administrative divisions ==
The county is subdivided into six gminas (one urban, one urban-rural and four rural). These are listed in the following table, in descending order of population.

Gmina	Type	Area (km^{2})	Population (2019)	Seat
Działdowo	urban	13.4	21,279	
Gmina Lidzbark	urban-rural	255.7	14,132	Lidzbark
Gmina Działdowo	rural	272.8	9,836	Działdowo *
Gmina Rybno	rural	147.5	7,205	Rybno
Gmina Iłowo-Osada	rural	103.8	7,203	Iłowo-Osada
Gmina Płośnica	rural	163.1	5,633	Płośnica
* seat not part of the gmina
