= Soldau concentration camp =

Nazi concentration camp in Działdowo

KL Soldau (Działdowo)
- Concentration camp
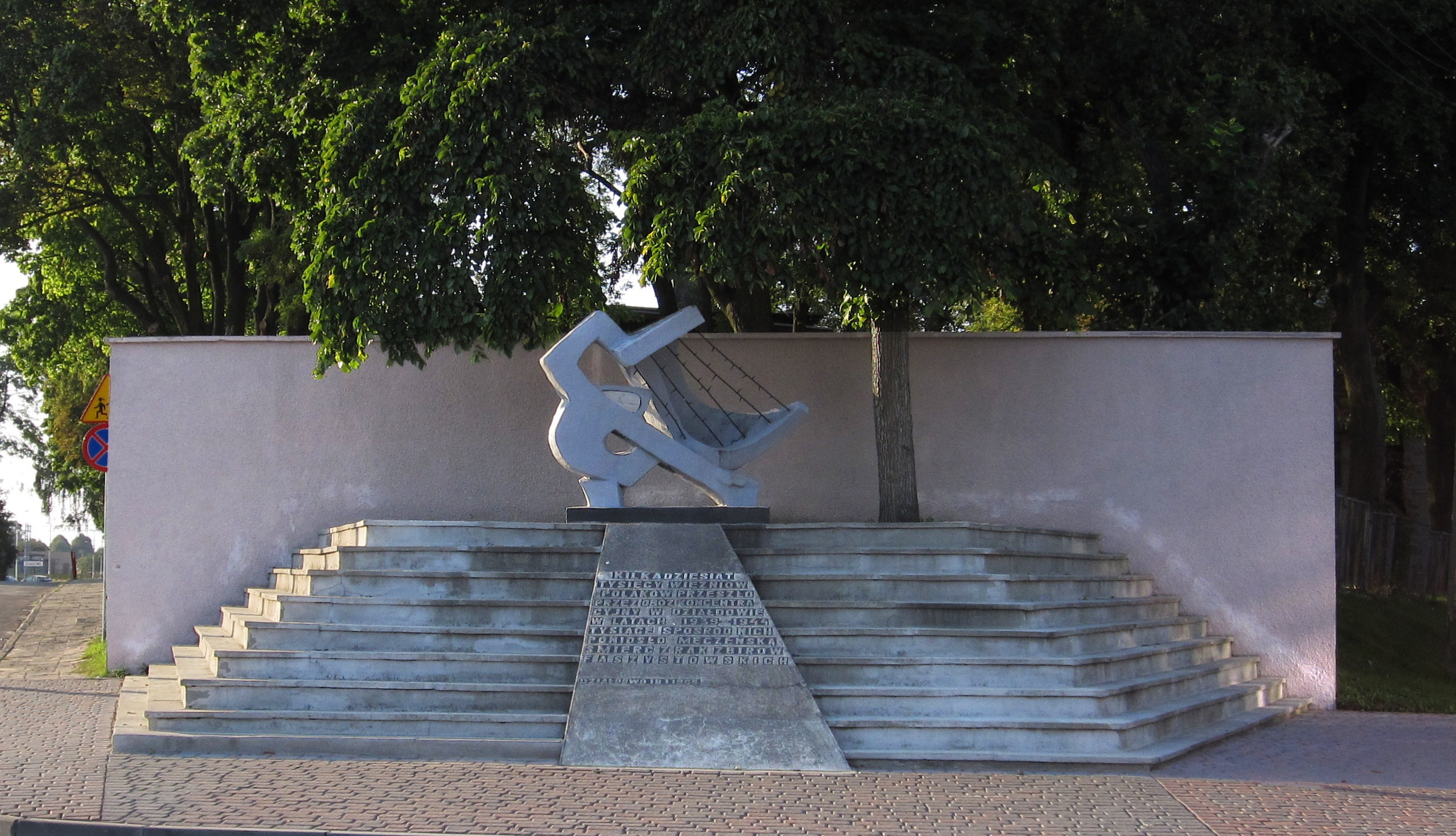
- Działdowo – Monument to Victims of Soldau concentration camp Location of KL Soldau in World War II, northwest of Treblinka death camp

- Location of KL Soldau in Poland today (Działdowo east of Jasło)
- Coordinates: 53°14′N 20°11′E
- Known for: Forced labor camp
- Location: Polish areas annexed by Nazi Germany
- Operated by: Schutzstaffel
- Number of inmates: Around 30,000
- Killed: 10,000

The Soldau concentration camp established by Nazi Germany during World War II was a concentration camp for Polish and Jewish prisoners. It was located in Działdowo (German: Soldau), a town in north-eastern Poland, which after the Nazi-Soviet invasion of Poland in September 1939 was annexed into the Province of East Prussia.

The camp was founded in the former Polish Army barracks by SS-Brigadeführer Otto Rasch with the approval of Reinhard Heydrich. The first prisoners were brought by the end of September 1939. They were the Polish Army defenders of the Modlin Fortress who were forced to capitulate due to lack of ammunition and food. The camp served different purposes throughout its existence. The Polish intelligentsia, priests and political prisoners were secretly executed there, in addition to 1,558 patients from all the psychiatric hospitals in the district. It also served as a transit center for deportations from East Prussia to the semi-colonial General Government, and for slave labour to the Reich. Originally intended to be temporary, for the initial 1,000 inmates, the camp soon became permanent and rezoned as an Arbeitserziehungslager for the civilians brought in from across the new German Zichenau. Some 10,000–13,000 prisoners died there, out of a total of 30,000. After the war, the International Tracing Service (ITS) initially classified the camp as a Vernichtungslager (extermination camp), due to the sheer number of victims.

== Camp history ==
The town of Działdowo was located in the part of occupied Poland which was annexed to the Third Reich. The first civilian prisoners arrived in trucks and in trains from the towns on the Polish–East Prussian border, evicted from their homes by the Nazis in an attempt to ethnically cleanse the area of non-Germans entirely. Also, the camp conducted early experiments in gassing. In accordance with Action T4, mental patients at sanatoria in East Prussia, like the Provincial Mental Sanatorium Kortau, and Regierungsbezirk Zichenau were taken to the Soldau camp; 1,558 patients were murdered by the Lange Commando in a gas van from May 21 to June 8, 1940. Lange used his experience with exhaust gasses acquired at Soldau in setting up the Chelmno extermination camp thereafter.

There were no toilet barracks, only two holes in the ground with boards put across each, out in the open. An epidemic of typhus broke out killing six German guards among countless prisoners. During the summer of 1941, the Soldau camp was reorganized as an Arbeitserziehungslager (literally "work education camp"). The labor camp's prisoners, split between separate sub-camps, were engaged in forced agricultural labor and in construction. The camp was closed in January 1945. Some 13,000 prisoners out of 30,000 perished according to Polish official estimates.

The mass killings were conducted in the Białucki Forest (Las Białucki) spread over several hundred hectares. There was a road leading to it, built by the prisoners themselves. The victims were trucked in to the execution site. There was a small barracks for the awaiting SS shooters built in the forest along with five large pits on the right side of the road. Modern research suggests that the number of victims might have been greater than originally thought, reaching up to 20,000 people. Among them were not only Poles and Jews imprisoned at Soldau, but also Soviet POWs and even condemned Germans. At the end of 1944 dozens of Jews were brought in to incinerate corpses. All of them were massacred thereafter.

In 2019, 1.5 tonnes of burnt remains of murdered camp prisoners were discovered near the village of Białuty, and exhumation works were initiated. By July 2022, two mass graves were located in the Białuty Forest, containing about 17 tonnes of human ashes which was estimated to be at least that of 8000 persons most of whom were inmates of the camp.

=== Sub-camps ===
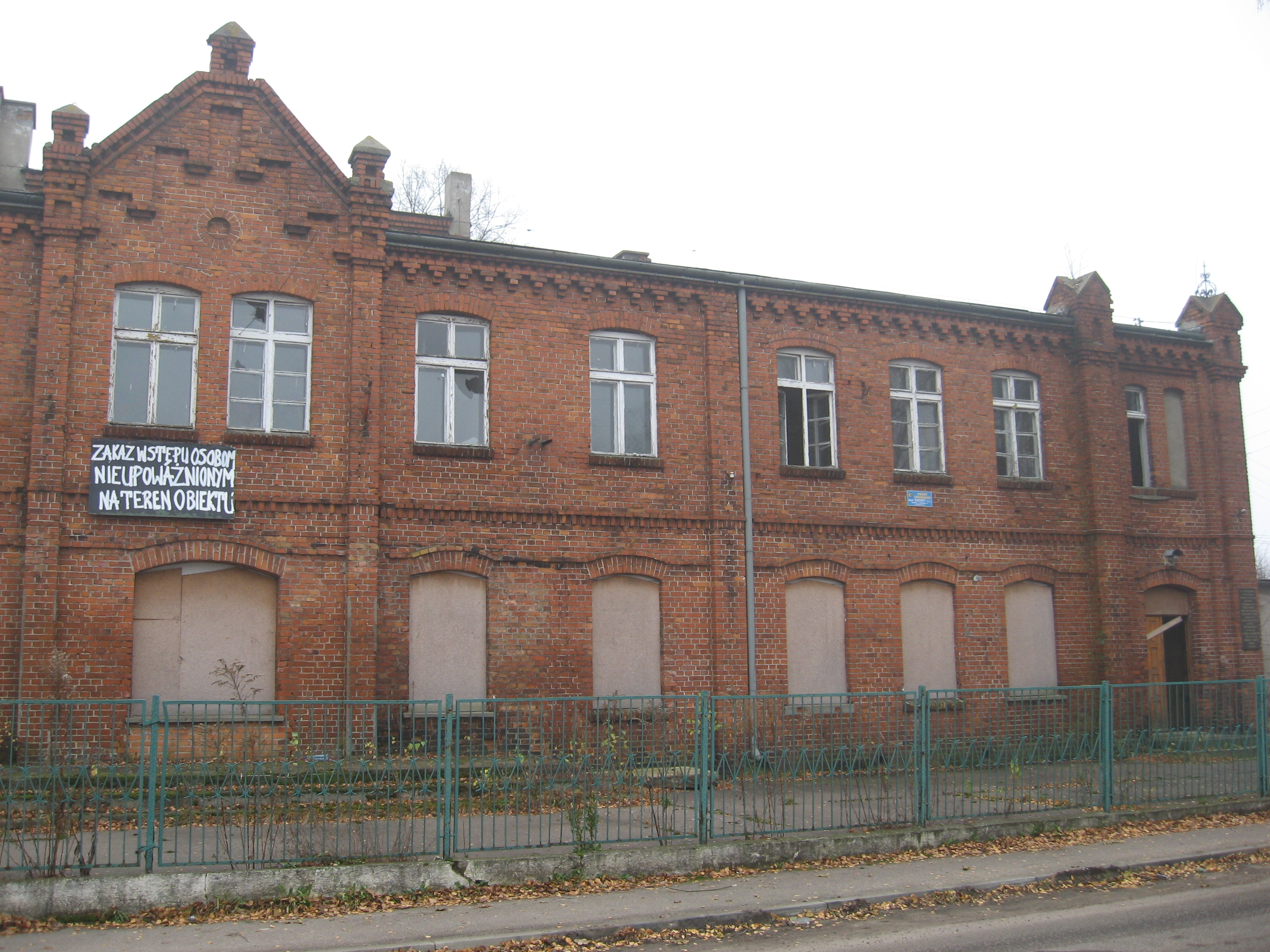
Historic location of the Nazi German transit camp in Iłowo-Osada, the sub-camp of Soldau concentration camp

The Soldau (Działdowo) concentration camp had three sub-camps where prisoners were held. The sub-camps were located in nearby settlements of Iłowo-Osada (pictured), Mławka, and Nosarzewo Borowe – the location of the Truppenübungsplatz "Mielau" military training range spread over an area of 300 square kilometres (120 sq mi). The range was built by prisoners of Soldau among other civilians. The facility, nicknamed the New Berlin, was used by the Nazis for repairing and refitting army tanks in Operation Barbarossa, and for testing anti-tank weapons and artillery.

The sub-camp known as the Iłowo transit camp existed in 1941–45. Prisoners were held at a brick building (pictured) and the adjacent barracks in Iłowo. Up to 2,000 Polish children five years old and younger were among the prisoners as well as pregnant women-inmates awaiting birth. The men, including Poles and the Soviets (following Operation Barbarossa), were kept there usually for several days only before transfer. Many of the children belonged to slave labourers who were already deported to the Third Reich. The children underwent selections for Germanization and were being sent to German families. Among those who were not selected death rate was very high. There were no medicines in the camp and no doctors. The food and water were rationed. After giving birth the women prisoners were sent back to other work camps.

=== Notable inmates ===
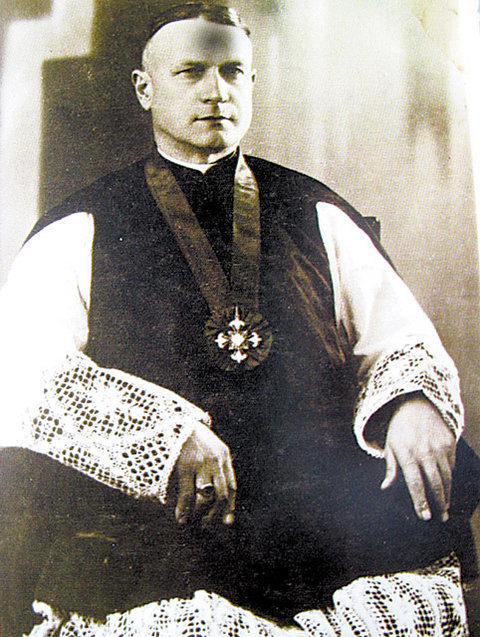
Priest Władysław Skierkowski, murdered at the camp in 1941

Known victims of Soldau concentration camp include:

- Blessed Antoni Julian Nowowiejski, Roman Catholic bishop (1858–1941)
- Blessed Leon Wetmański, Catholic bishop (1886–1941)
- Mieczysława Kowalska (pl), nun (1902–1941), one of 108 Martyrs of World War II beatified
- Władysław Skierkowski, priest (1886–1941)

== Soviet NKVD camp in Działdowo ==
Following the arrival of Red Army during the Soviet advance across Poland on 18 January 1945, the vacated Nazi camp in Działdowo was reinstated, this time by the NKVD secret police as a Soviet concentration camp for prisoners, both native German (the Reichsdeutsche) as well as Volksdeutsche from the regions of Pomerania, Warmia, Masuria and Mazowsze. The camp was liquidated at the end of 1945. The inmates were transported out of Poland in freight trains to camps in the Soviet Union.

== See also ==
- List of Nazi-German concentration camps
- SS-Truppenübungsplatz Heidelager in Pustków, Podkarpackie Voivodeship
- SS-Truppenübungsplatz Westpreußen located in Dziemiany
