= Narzym railway station =

Railway station in Narzym, Poland

Narzym

General information
- Location: Narzym, Warmian-Masurian Voivodeship; Poland
- System: Railway Station
- Operator: Masovian Railways
- Line: 9: Warsaw–Gdańsk railway
- Platforms: 2
- Tracks: 2

History
- Opened: 1906; 120 years ago
Location
- Location within Poland

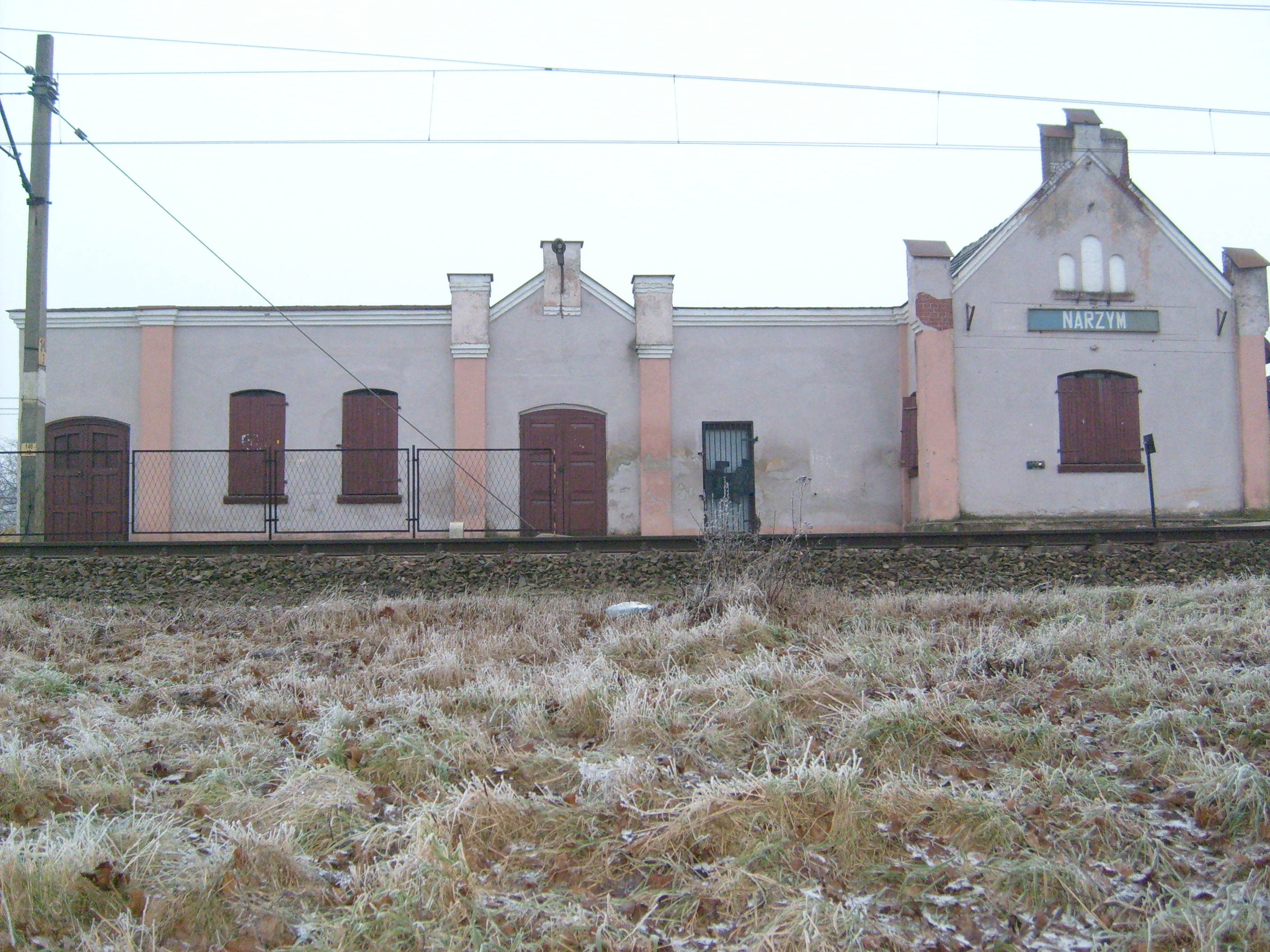
Narzym railway station building, 2008

Narzym railway station is a railway station serving the village of Narzym, in the Warmian-Masurian Voivodeship, Poland. The station opened in 1906 and is located on the Warsaw–Gdańsk railway and the train services are operated by Masovian Railways.

== Train services ==
The station is served by the following service(s):

- Regional services (R90/RE90) Dzialdowo - Mlawa - Nasielsk - Modlin - Legionowo - Warsaw

Preceding station	Masovian Railways	Following station
Działdowo Terminus	R90	Iłowo towards Warszawa Zachodnia
Działdowo Terminus	RE90	Iłowo towards Warszawa Zachodnia
