= Sochy =

Sochy may refer to:

- Sochy, Warmian-Masurian Voivodeship
- Sochy, Lublin Voivodeship
