= Wierzbowo =

Wierzbowo may refer to the following places:

- Wierzbowo, Kuyavian-Pomeranian Voivodeship (north-central Poland)
- Wierzbowo, Grajewo County in Podlaskie Voivodeship (north-east Poland)
- Wierzbowo, Łomża County in Podlaskie Voivodeship (north-east Poland)
- Wierzbowo, Masovian Voivodeship (east-central Poland)
- Wierzbowo, Działdowo County in Warmian-Masurian Voivodeship (north Poland)
- Wierzbowo, Ełk County in Warmian-Masurian Voivodeship (north Poland)
- Wierzbowo, Mrągowo County in Warmian-Masurian Voivodeship (north Poland)
- Wierzbowo, Nidzica County in Warmian-Masurian Voivodeship (north Poland)
