= Chorap =

- Village
- Location within Poland
- Coordinates: 53°14′N 20°18′E
- Country: Poland
- Voivodeship: Warmian-Masurian
- County: Działdowo
- Gmina: Iłowo-Osada

Chorap [ˈxɔrap] is a village in the administrative district of Gmina Iłowo-Osada, within Działdowo County, Warmian-Masurian Voivodeship, in northern Poland.
