= Gmina Iłowo-Osada =

Gmina Iłowo-Osada Iłowo-Osada Commune
- Gmina
- Coat of arms

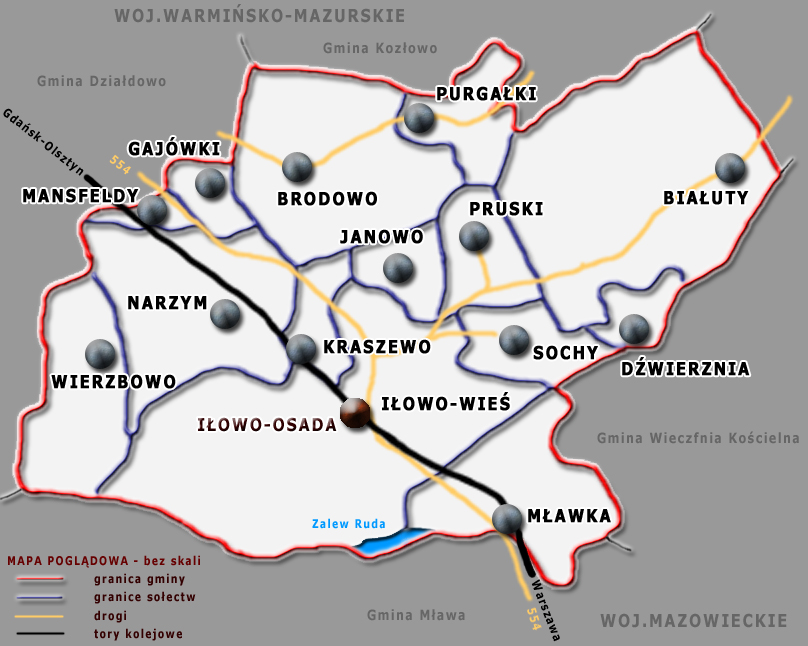
- Coordinates (Iłowo-Osada): 53°10′1″N 20°17′35″E
- Country: Poland
- Voivodeship: Warmian-Masurian
- County: Działdowo
- Seat: Iłowo-Osada

Area
  - Total: 103.8 km^{2} (40.1 sq mi)

Population (2011)
  - Total: 7,359
  - Density: 70.90/km^{2} (183.6/sq mi)

Gmina Iłowo-Osada is a rural gmina (administrative district) in Działdowo County, Warmian-Masurian Voivodeship, in northern Poland. Its seat is the village of Iłowo-Osada, which lies approximately 11 kilometres (7 mi) south-east of Działdowo and 70 km (43 mi) south of the regional capital Olsztyn.

The gmina covers an area of 103.8 square kilometres (40.1 sq mi), and as of 2006 its total population is 7,167 (7,359 in 2011).

== Villages ==
Gmina Iłowo-Osada contains the villages and settlements of Białuty, Białuty Kolonia, Brodowo, Chorap, Dwukoły, Dźwierznia, Gajówki, Iłowo-Osada, Iłowo-Wieś, Janowo, Kolonie Narzymskie, Krajewo, Kraszewo, Mansfeldy, Mławka, Narzym, Pruski, Purgałki, Sochy and Wierzbowo. Until 2003 it also included the village of Piekiełko, which is now a part of the town of Mława in neighbouring Masovian Voivodeship.

== Neighbouring gminas ==
Gmina Iłowo-Osada is bordered by the town of Mława and by the gminas of Działdowo, Janowiec Kościelny, Kozłowo, Lipowiec Kościelny and Wieczfnia Kościelna.
