= Iłowo railway station =

Railway station in Iłowo-Osada, Poland

Iłowo
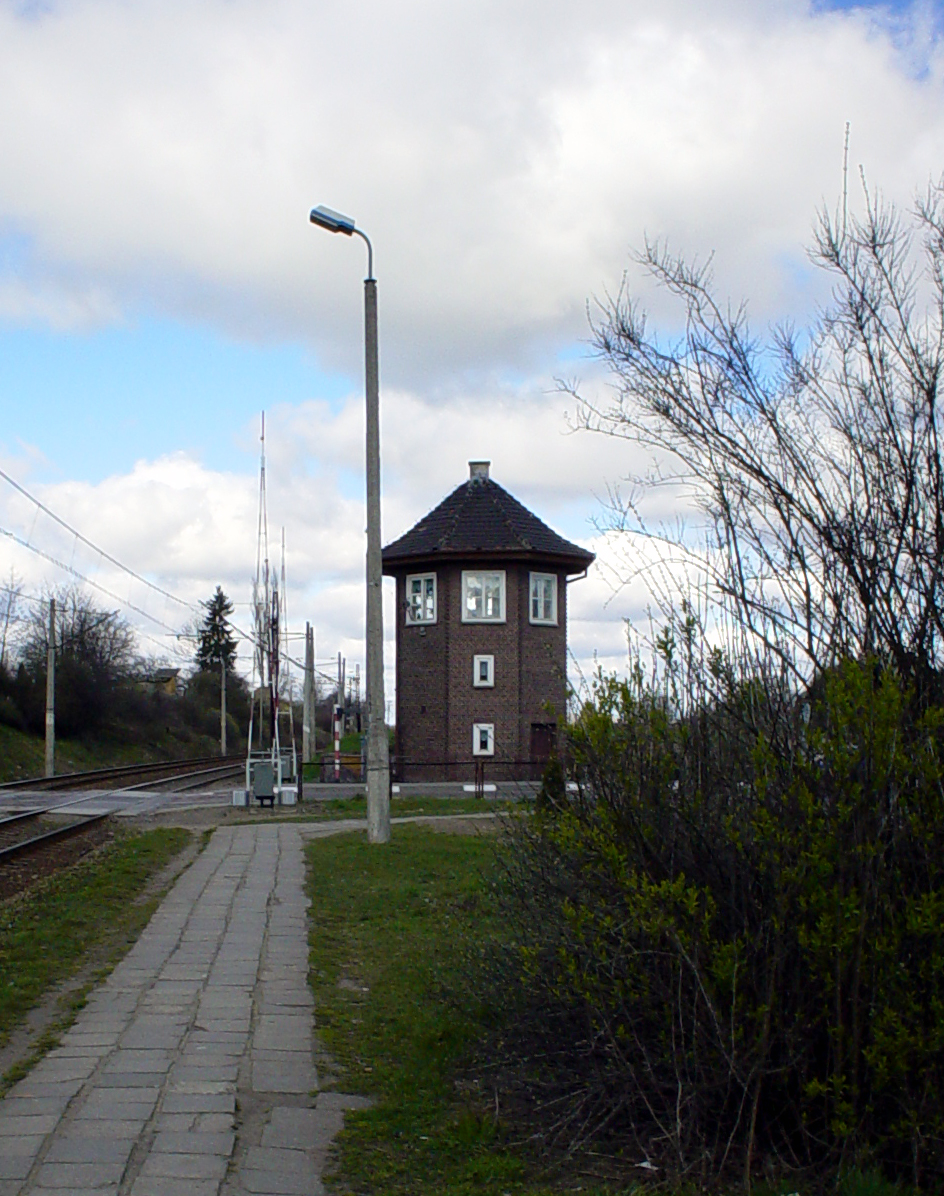

General information
- Location: Iłowo-Osada, Działdowo, Warmian-Masurian; Poland
- Coordinates: 53.1658301°N 20.2936312°E
- System: Rail Station
- Owner: Polskie Koleje Państwowe S.A.

Services
Preceding station	Masovian Railways	Following station
Mława towards Warszawa Zachodnia	R9	Narzym towards Działdowo
Mława towards Warszawa Zachodnia	R90	Narzym towards Działdowo
Mława towards Warszawa Zachodnia	RE9	Narzym towards Działdowo
Mława towards Warszawa Zachodnia	RE90	Narzym towards Działdowo
Location

Iłowo railway station is a railway station at Iłowo-Osada, Działdowo, Warmian-Masurian, Poland. It is served by Masovian Railways.
