= Białuty, Warmian-Masurian Voivodeship =

Białuty
- Village
- Location within Poland
- Coordinates: 53°12′N 20°23′E
- Country: Poland
- Voivodeship: Warmian-Masurian
- County: Działdowo
- Gmina: Iłowo-Osada

Population
  - Total: 600
- Time zone: UTC+1 (CET)
  - Summer (DST): UTC+2 (CEST)
- Vehicle registration: NDZ

Białuty [bjaˈwutɨ] is a village in the administrative district of Gmina Iłowo-Osada, within Działdowo County, Warmian-Masurian Voivodeship, in northern Poland.

The village structure of Białuty was shaped by the manor estate and its outlying farms, Dębini and Pruski. Postcards from the period before World War II depict, alongside the manor house, both the Protestant and Catholic churches as well as the "Gasthaus Aug. Sawetzki". Today, the manor estate, the Protestant church, and the hereditary burial site of the Oehlrich estate-owning family are in ruins.

In July 2022, two mass graves were found in the nearby Białuty Forest. The graves contained ca. 17 tonnes of human ashes, estimated to originate from at least 8,000 inmates of the Soldau concentration camp (1940–1944).
