= Iłowo-Osada =

- Village
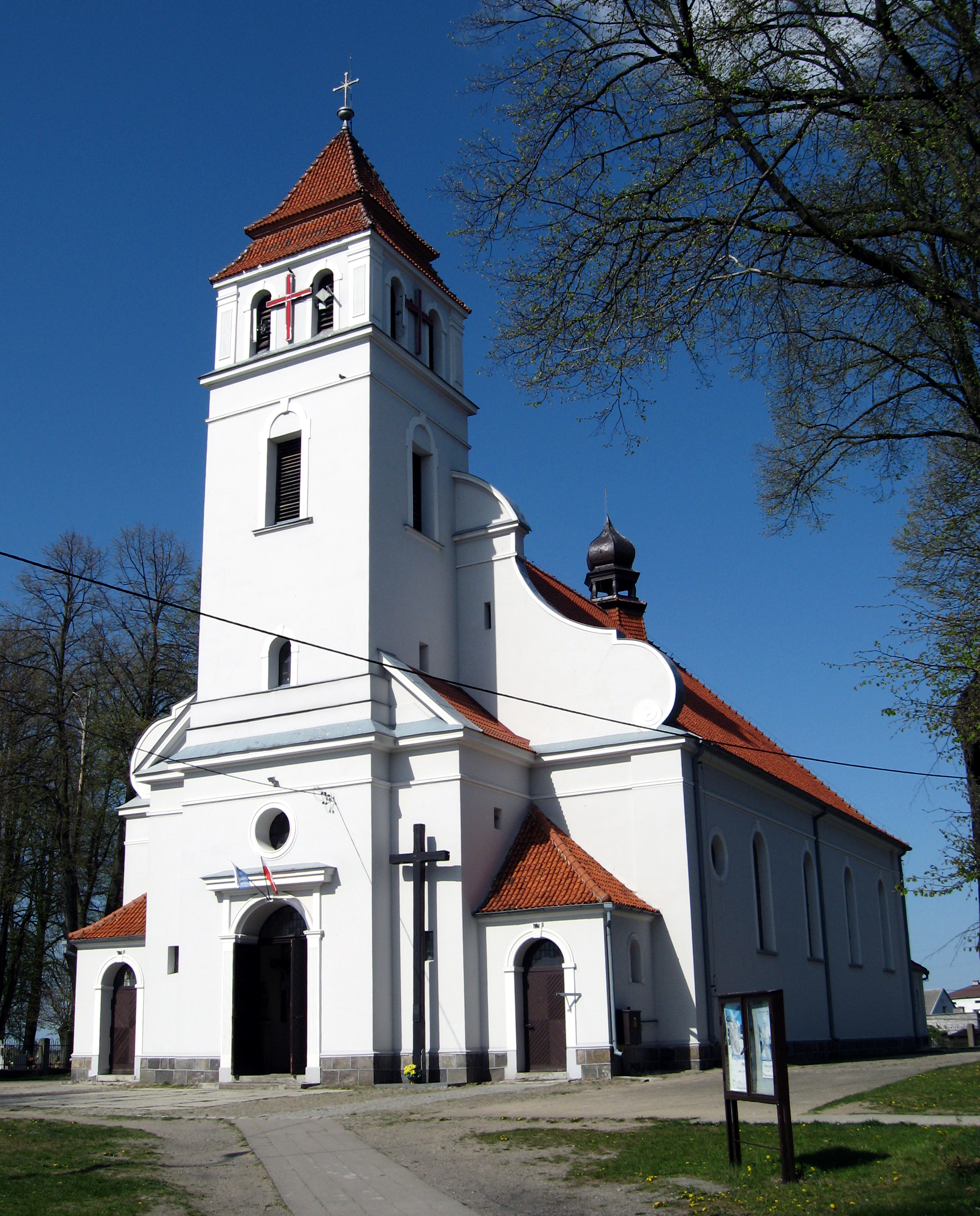
- Church of Our Lady of the Rosary

- Location within Poland
- Coordinates: 53°10′1″N 20°17′35″E
- Country: Poland
- Voivodeship: Warmian-Masurian
- County: Działdowo
- Gmina: Iłowo-Osada

Population
  - Total: 2,800
- Time zone: UTC+1 (CET)
  - Summer (DST): UTC+2 (CEST)
- Vehicle registration: NDZ

Iłowo-Osada pronounced [iˈwɔvɔ - ɔˈsada] is a village in Działdowo County, Warmian-Masurian Voivodeship, in northern Poland. It is the seat of the gmina (administrative district) called Gmina Iłowo-Osada. It is located in the historic region of Masuria.

== History ==
Since 1260, the local area was ruled by the Teutonic Order, later Prussia and the German Empire. As the area bordered Masovia, it received a large influx of Polish people, later called Masurians.

Based on historical and cartographical records, Iłowo-Osada itself was founded as a railway town in the 19th century, due to the Iłowo station founded on the Warsaw-Gdańsk railway (also serving as a German border station) as opposed to the near Iłowo-Wieś which existed for a longer period of time as a natural village. Over time, Iłowo-Osada grew larger, with Iłowo being split in twain due to the two different settlements. In the late 19th century, the village had an almost entirely Polish population of 416.

=== World War II ===
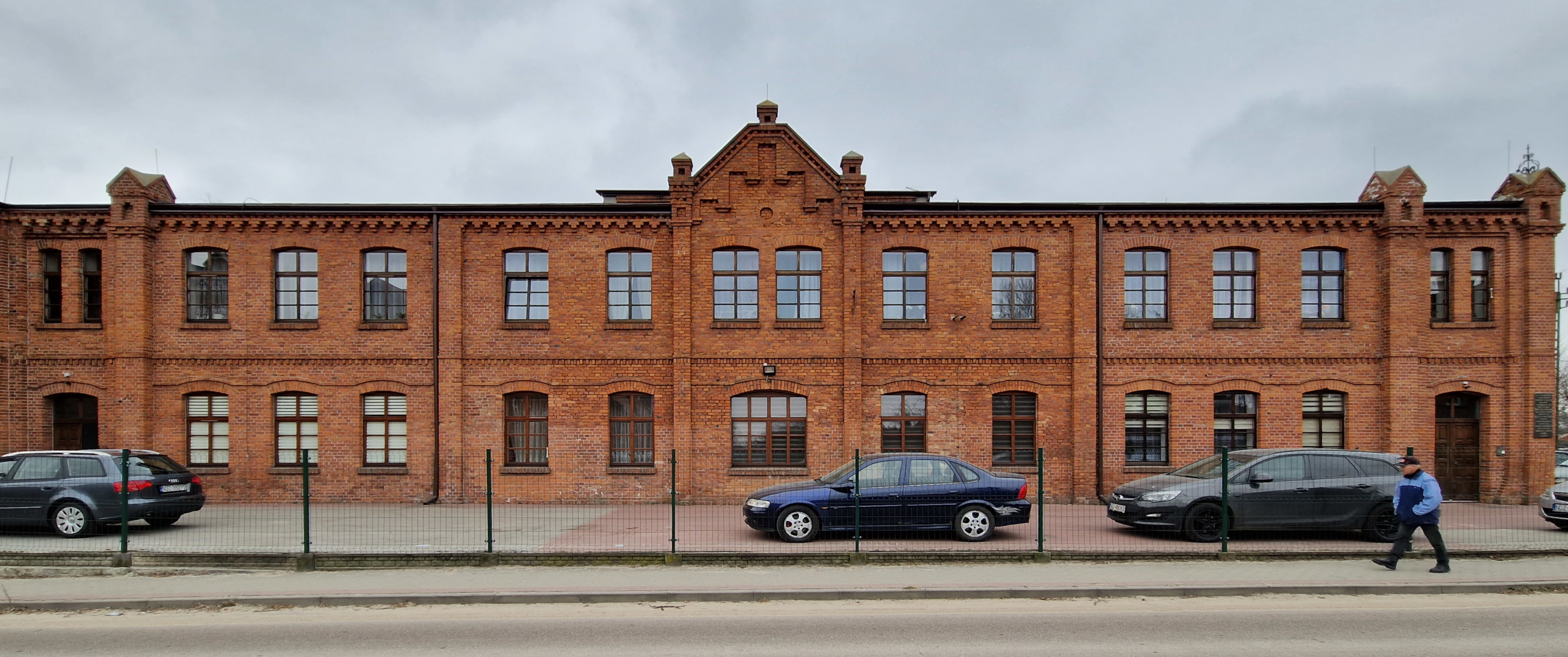
Historic location of the Nazi German transit camp in Iłowo-Osada awaiting renovation

Following the invasion of Poland by Nazi Germany, Iłowo became the location of one of three sub-camps of the Soldau concentration camp in nearby Działdowo. The Iłowo transit camp existed in 1941–45. Prisoners were held at a brick building (pictured) and the adjacent barracks.

Up to 2,000 Polish children 5-years-old and younger were among the prisoners as well as pregnant women-inmates awaiting birth (see also Kidnapping of children by Nazi Germany). The men, including Poles and the Soviets (following Operation Barbarossa), were kept there usually for several days only. Many children belonged to slave labourers already deported to the Third Reich. The children underwent selection for Germanization before being sent to German families. Among those who were not selected death rate was very high. There were no medicines in the camp and no doctors. The food and water were rationed. After giving birth women prisoners were sent back to work camps.

In 1940 and 1942, the German gendarmerie and police also carried out expulsions of local Poles, whose houses and workshops were then handed over to German colonists as part of the Lebensraum policy.

== Transport ==
There is a train station in the village.

== Sports ==
The local football club is Polonia Iłowo. It competes in the lower leagues.

== Notable residents ==
- Hans Kummetz (1890-1918), German flying ace
- Oskar Kummetz (1891–1980), German admiral
- Henryk Szordykowski, Polish athlete
