= Purgałki =

- Village
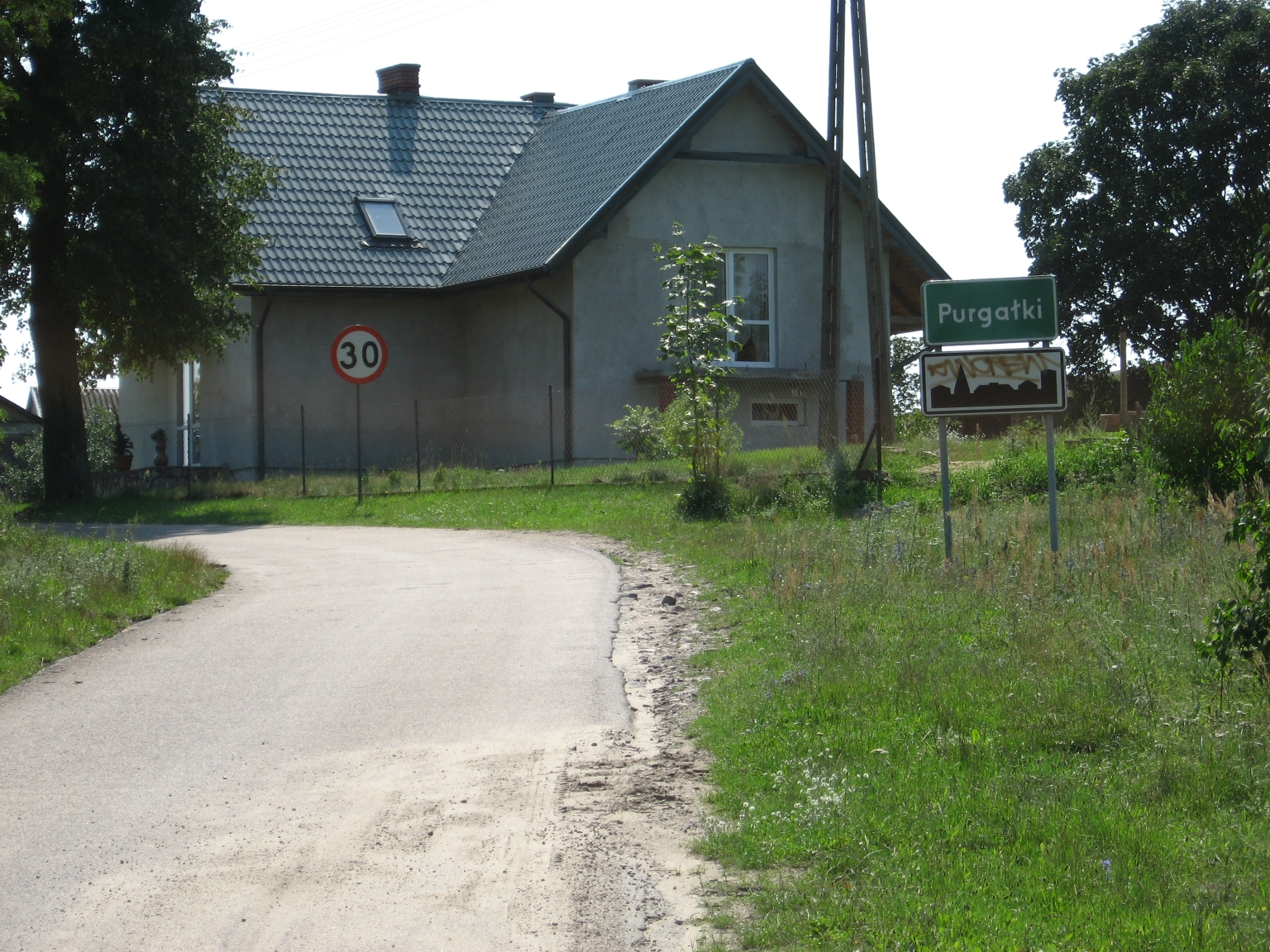
- View of Purgałki in 2008.

- Location within Poland
- Coordinates: 53°13′11″N 20°19′35″E
- Country: Poland
- Voivodeship: Warmian-Masurian
- County: Działdowo
- Gmina: Iłowo-Osada

Purgałki [purˈɡau̯ki] is a village in the administrative district of Gmina Iłowo-Osada, within Działdowo County, Warmian-Masurian Voivodeship, in northern Poland.
