= Piekiełko, Mława =

Piekiełko
- Location within Poland
- Coordinates: 53°10′19″N 20°21′53″E
- Country: Poland
- Voivodeship: Masovian Voivodeship
- County: Mława County
- Gmina: Mława (urban gmina)

Piekiełko [pjɛˈkʲɛu̯kɔ] is part of the town in Mława in Masovian Voivodeship, east-central Poland. Until 2004, it was a village in the administrative district of Gmina Iłowo-Osada, within Działdowo County, Warmian-Masurian Voivodeship. It lies approximately 5 kilometres (3 mi) east of Iłowo-Osada and 14 km (9 mi) southeast of Działdowo.
