= Nosarzewo Borowe =

- Village
- Location within Poland
- Coordinates: 53°6′N 20°32′E
- Country: Poland
- Voivodeship: Masovian
- County: Mława
- Gmina: Szydłowo

Nosarzewo Borowe [nɔsaˈʐɛvɔ bɔˈrɔvɛ] is a village in the administrative district of Gmina Szydłowo, within Mława County, Masovian Voivodeship, in east-central Poland.

== World War II ==
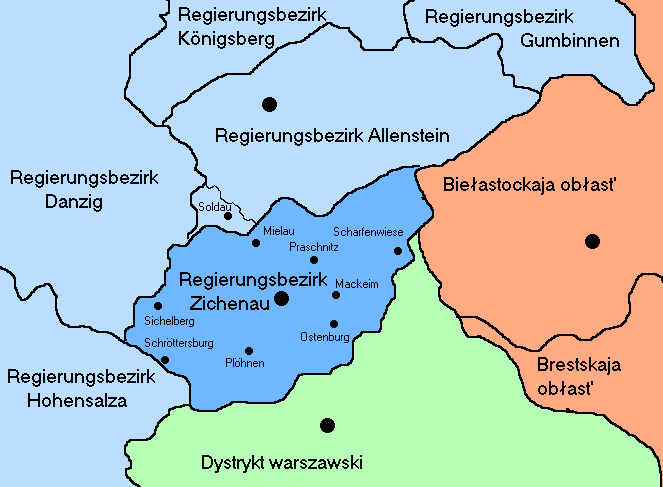
Location of Truppenübungsplatz Mielau (centre north) on the map of Regierungsbezirk Zichenau

Following the invasion of Poland by Nazi Germany, in the winter of 1940 all inhabitants of Nosarzewo were expelled. The "action" affected fifteen neighbouring villages. Some 25,000 people were extracted from their homes which were completely dismantled afterwards. On an area of 300 square kilometres (120 sq mi) a vast military training range was built by prisoners of the Soldau concentration camp nearby. It was known as the Truppenübungsplatz "Mielau", nicknamed the New Berlin. The facility was used by the Nazis for repairing and refitting army tanks in Operation Barbarossa, and for testing anti-tank weapons and artillery.

The Polish settlements destroyed to make room for the new range included Nosarzewo, Dębsk, Nieradowo, Marianowo, Pawłowo, Kluszewo, Garlino, Zalesie, Żarnow, Zawady, Wiksin, Rąbierz, Kołakow, Budy, and Niemyje. Some were never rebuilt. Similar Nazi German military ranges in occupied Poland included the SS-Truppenübungsplatz Heidelager located in Pustków, Podkarpackie Voivodeship and the SS-Truppenübungsplatz Westpreußen located in Dziemiany.

== See also ==
- Zichenau (region) or Regierungsbezirk Zichenau of the Nazi German Province of East Prussia in 1939–45
