= Gajówki =

- Village
- Location within Poland
- Coordinates: 53°12′N 20°14′E
- Country: Poland
- Voivodeship: Warmian-Masurian
- County: Działdowo
- Gmina: Iłowo-Osada

Gajówki [ɡaˈjufki] is a village in the administrative district of Gmina Iłowo-Osada, within Działdowo County, Warmian-Masurian Voivodeship, in northern Poland.
