= Białuty Kolonia =

Village in Gmina Iłowo-Osada, Poland

- Village
- Location within Poland
- Coordinates: 53°11′47″N 20°21′55″E
- Country: Poland
- Voivodeship: Warmian-Masurian
- County: Działdowo
- Gmina: Iłowo-Osada

Białuty Kolonia [bjaˈwutɨ kɔˈlɔɲa] is a village in the administrative district of Gmina Iłowo-Osada, within Działdowo County, Warmian-Masurian Voivodeship, in northern Poland.
