= Mansfeldy =

- Village
- Location within Poland
- Coordinates: 53°12′23″N 20°13′30″E
- Country: Poland
- Voivodeship: Warmian-Masurian
- County: Działdowo
- Gmina: Iłowo-Osada
- Population: 70

Mansfeldy [mansˈfɛldɨ] is a village in the administrative district of Gmina Iłowo-Osada, within Działdowo County, Warmian-Masurian Voivodeship, in northern Poland.
