= Brodowo, Działdowo County =

Brodowo
- Village
- Location within Poland
- Coordinates: 53°12′N 20°16′E
- Country: Poland
- Voivodeship: Warmian-Masurian
- County: Działdowo
- Gmina: Iłowo-Osada
- Population: 340

Brodowo [brɔˈdɔvɔ] is a village in the administrative district of Gmina Iłowo-Osada, within Działdowo County, Warmian-Masurian Voivodeship, in northern Poland.
