= Sochy, Warmian-Masurian Voivodeship =

Sochy
- Village
- Location within Poland
- Coordinates: 53°10′N 20°20′E
- Country: Poland
- Voivodeship: Lubelskie
- County: Zamojski
- Gmina: Zwierzyniec
- Population: 110

Sochy [ˈsɔxɨ] is a village in the administrative district of Gmina Iłowo-Osada, within Działdowo County, Warmian-Masurian Voivodeship, in northern Poland.
