= Mławka, Warmian-Masurian Voivodeship =

Mławka
- Village
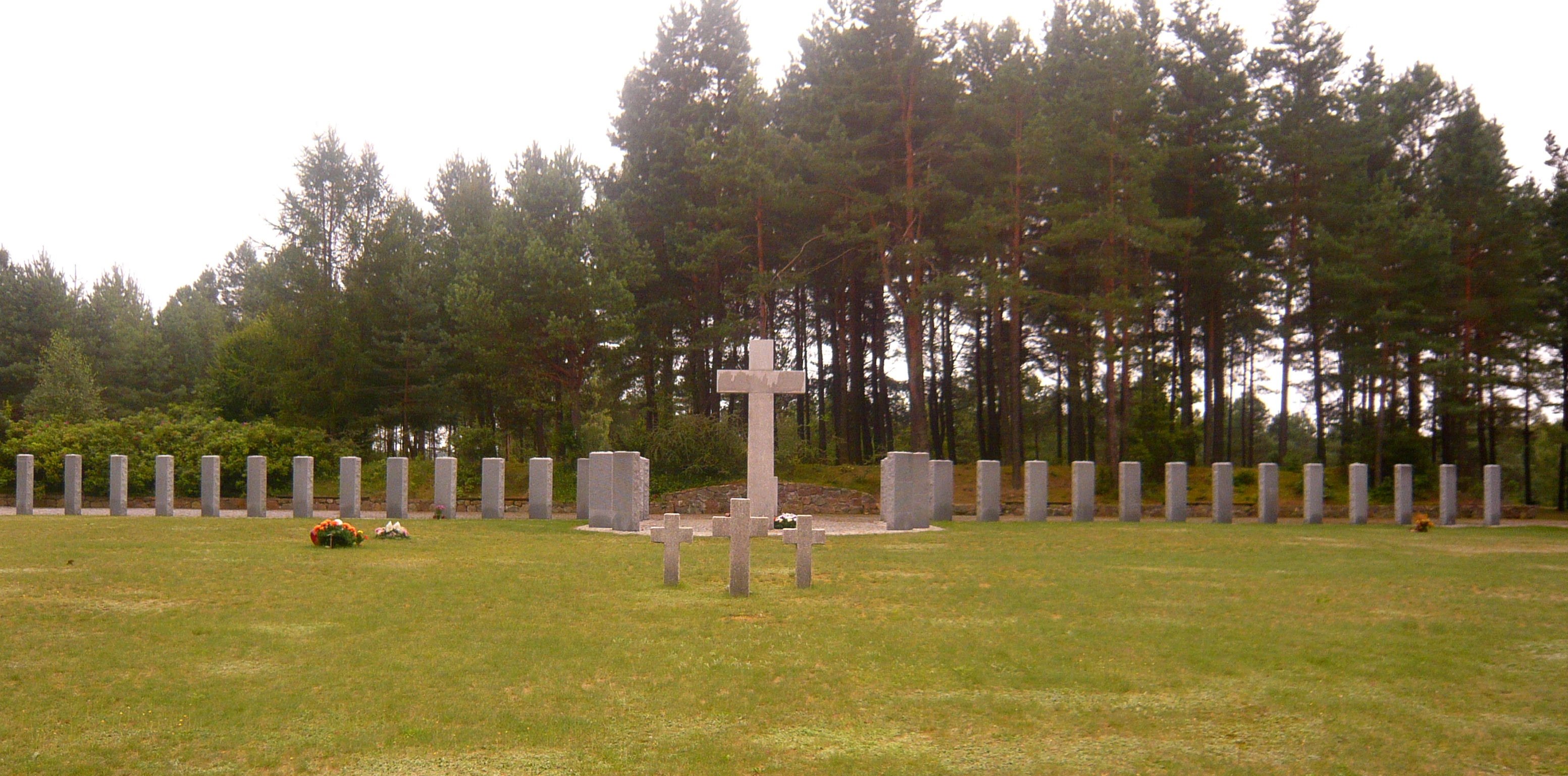
- War cemetery in Mławka

- Location within Poland
- Coordinates: 53°8′N 20°20′E
- Country: Poland
- Voivodeship: Warmian-Masurian
- County: Działdowo
- Gmina: Iłowo-Osada

Population
  - Total: 190
- Time zone: UTC+1 (CET)
  - Summer (DST): UTC+2 (CEST)
- Postal code: 13-240
- Vehicle registration: NDZ

Mławka [ˈmwafka] is a village in the administrative district of Gmina Iłowo-Osada, within Działdowo County, Warmian-Masurian Voivodeship, in northern Poland.

== History ==
During the German occupation in World War II, in 1942, the occupiers established a forced labour camp in the village.
