= Dziemiany =

- Village
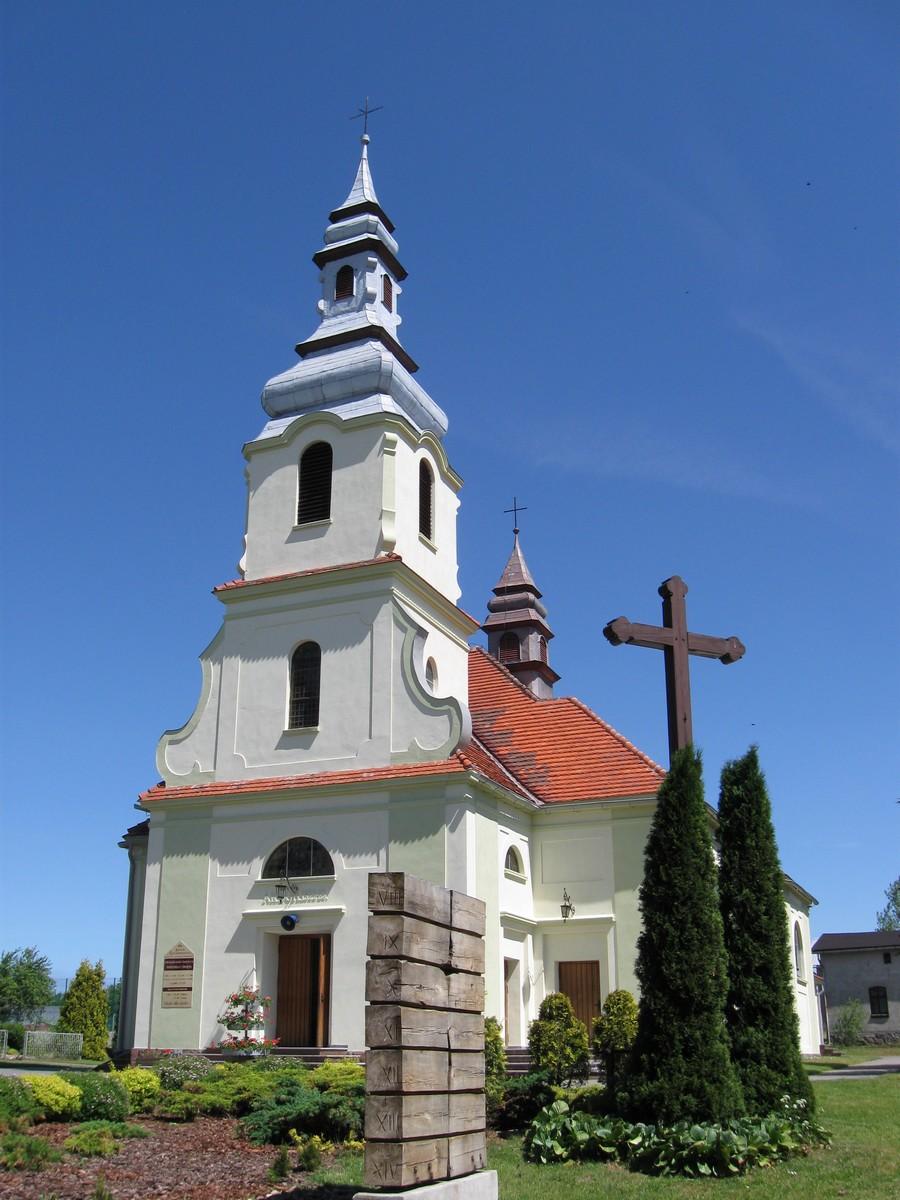
- Saint Anthony church in Dziemiany

- Location within Poland
- Coordinates: 54°0′23″N 17°46′6″E
- Country: Poland
- Voivodeship: Pomeranian
- County: Kościerzyna
- Gmina: Dziemiany
- Population: 1,751
- Time zone: UTC+1 (CET)
  - Summer (DST): UTC+2 (CEST)

Dziemiany pronounced [d͡ʑɛˈmʲanɨ] is a village in Kościerzyna County, Pomeranian Voivodeship, in northern Poland. It is the seat of the gmina (administrative district) called Gmina Dziemiany. It was the location of the Nazi concentration camp Dzimianen - Sophienwalde, a subcamp of the concentration camp Stutthof. Here the SS-Truppenübungsplatz Westpreußen was located during the occupation of Poland in World War II.

== History ==
Dziemiany was a royal village of the Polish Crown, administratively located in the Tczew County in the Pomeranian Voivodeship.

=== World War II ===
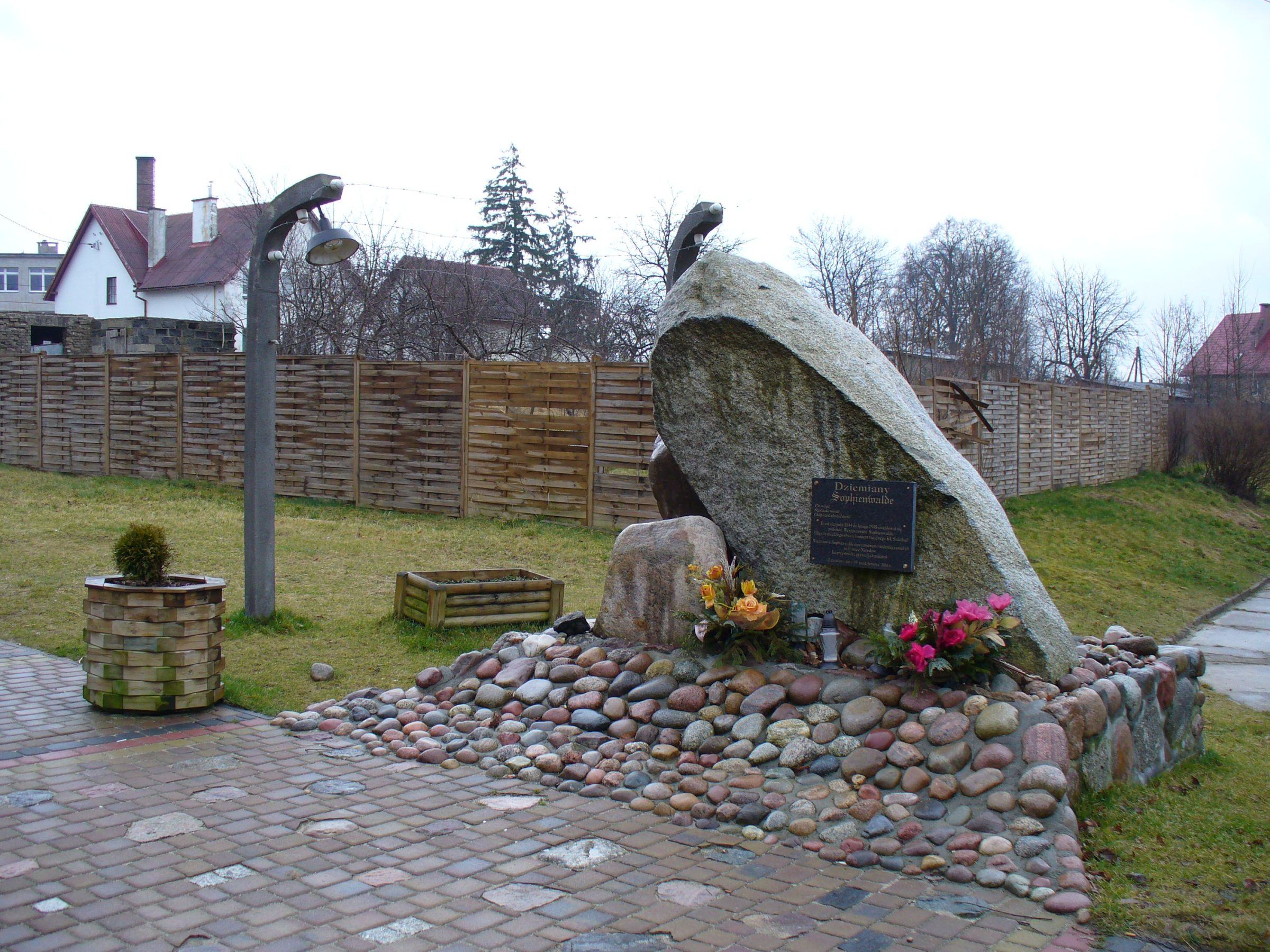
Memorial stone to prisoner victims of concentration camp Westpreussen Sophienwalde of the KL Stutthof in Dziemiany, who perished between August 1944 and February 1945 as slave labour for the SS-Truppenübungsplatz Westpreußen

Dziemiany was overrun on the second day of the Nazi German invasion of Poland of September 1939. Several weeks later on 26 October 1939 by a decree of Adolf Hitler the region was annexed into the Reich as Reichsagau Danzig Westpreussen. Dziemiany was renamed Sophienwalde, population: 4,428 ethnic Poles. Deportations and expulsions of all prominent citizens followed. Polish schools and all institutions were shut down.

In the fall of 1943 during Operation Barbarossa the Germans began constructing military range called the Truppenübungsplatz Westpreußen in Dziemiany and neighbouring villages on an area of 700 square kilometres (270 sq mi). All farmers were deported to Potulice concentration camp. The range was designed for training of the new SS Sturm brigades including Waffen-SS, as well as rocket testing. It was built by around 1,000 international prisoners kept at the barracks of a temporary camp in Brusy, the 300 inmates of KL Potulice, and about 400–500 prisoners of KL Stutthof. Notable group of about 400 slave workers arrived in the fall of 1944, captured in the Warsaw Uprising. Also notable was the group of about 500 Jewish women kept at the sub-camp in Dziemiany (Sophienwalde) employed to service the SS soldiers. In total, the range was built by about 3,000 prisoners. The first trainees arrived from Latvia, Romania and Hungary. Average training lasted from two to six weeks. The range was never fully completed, because of the Soviet advance.

== Notable people ==
- Łukasz Chyła (born 1981 in Dziemiany) a track and field sprint athlete who competes internationally for Poland

== See also ==
- List of Nazi-German concentration camps
- SS-Truppenübungsplatz Heidelager in Pustków, Podkarpackie Voivodeship
- SS-Truppenübungsplatz Mielau located in Nosarzewo Borowe
