= Great Frost of 1709 =

Coldest recorded winter in Europe

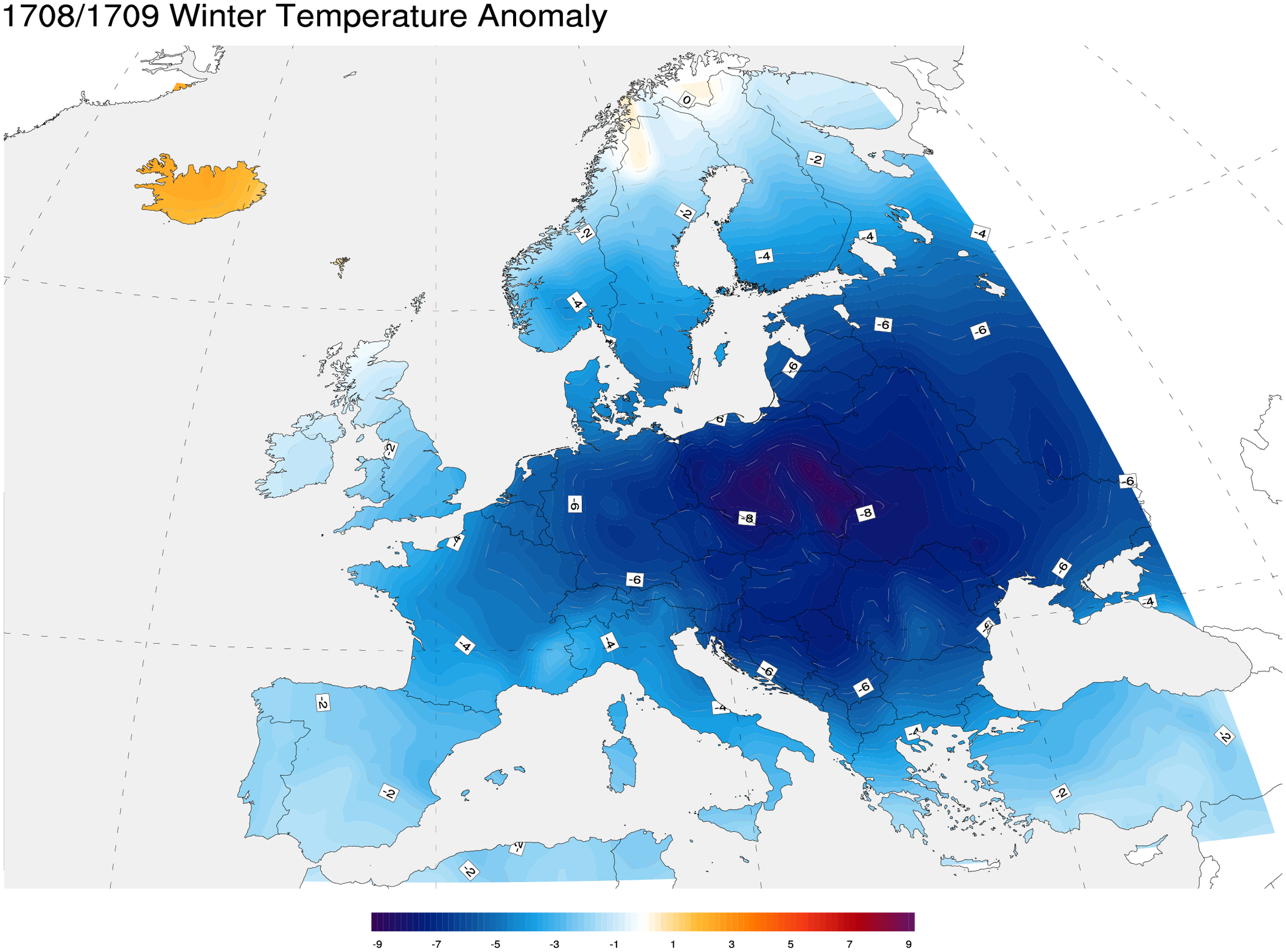
- 1708/1709 winter temperature anomaly with respect to 1971–2000 climatology
- Also known as: Le Grand Hiver

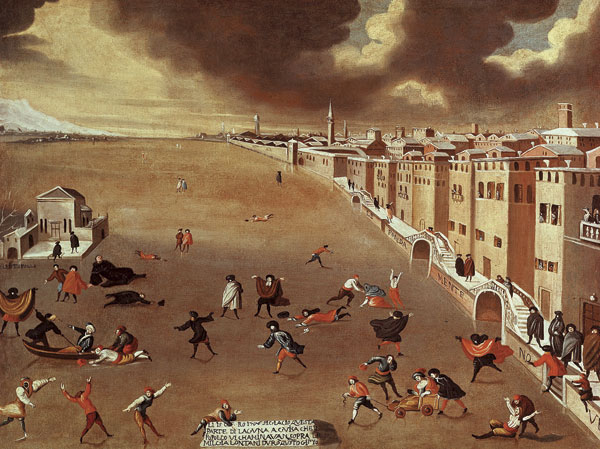
Le lagon gelé en 1709, by Gabriele Bella, part of a lagoon which froze over in 1709, Venice, Italy

The Great Frost, as it was known in England, or Le Grand Hiver ("The Great Winter"), as it was known in France, was an extraordinarily cold winter in Europe in 1708–1709, and was the coldest European winter during the past 500 years.

== Notability ==
William Derham recorded in Upminster, Great Britain, near London, a low of −12 °C (10 °F) on the night of 5 January 1709, the lowest he had ever measured since he started taking readings in 1697. His contemporaries in the weather observation field in Europe likewise recorded lows down to −15 °C (5 °F). Derham wrote in Philosophical Transactions: "I believe the Frost was greater (if not more universal also) than any other within the Memory of Man."

During the Great Northern War, the Swedish invasion of Russia was notably weakened by the severe winter. Sudden winter storms and frosts killed thousands during the Swedish army's winter offensives, most notably during a single night away from camp that killed at least 2,000. Because the Russian troops were more prepared for the harmful weather and cautiously stayed within their camps, their losses were substantially lower, contributing heavily to their eventual victory at Poltava the following summer.

France was particularly hard hit by the winter, with the subsequent famine estimated to have caused 600,000 deaths by the end of 1710. Because the famine occurred during France's engagement in the War of the Spanish Succession, there were contemporary nationalist claims that there were no deaths from starvation in the kingdom of France in 1709.

This winter event has drawn the attention of modern-day climatologists in the European Union's Millennium Project because they are currently unable to correlate the known causes of cold weather in Europe today with weather patterns documented in 1709. According to Dennis Wheeler, a climatologist at the University of Sunderland: "Something unusual seems to have been happening".

The severity of the winter is thought to be an important factor in the emigration of the German Palatines from central Europe.

Elizabeth Charlotte, Madame Palatine, the Duchess of Orléans, had written a letter to her great-aunt in Germany describing how she was still shivering from cold and could barely hold her pen despite having a roaring fire next to her, the door shut, and her entire person wrapped in furs. She wrote, "Never in my life have I seen a winter such as this one."
