= German war crimes during the invasion of Poland =

German war crimes

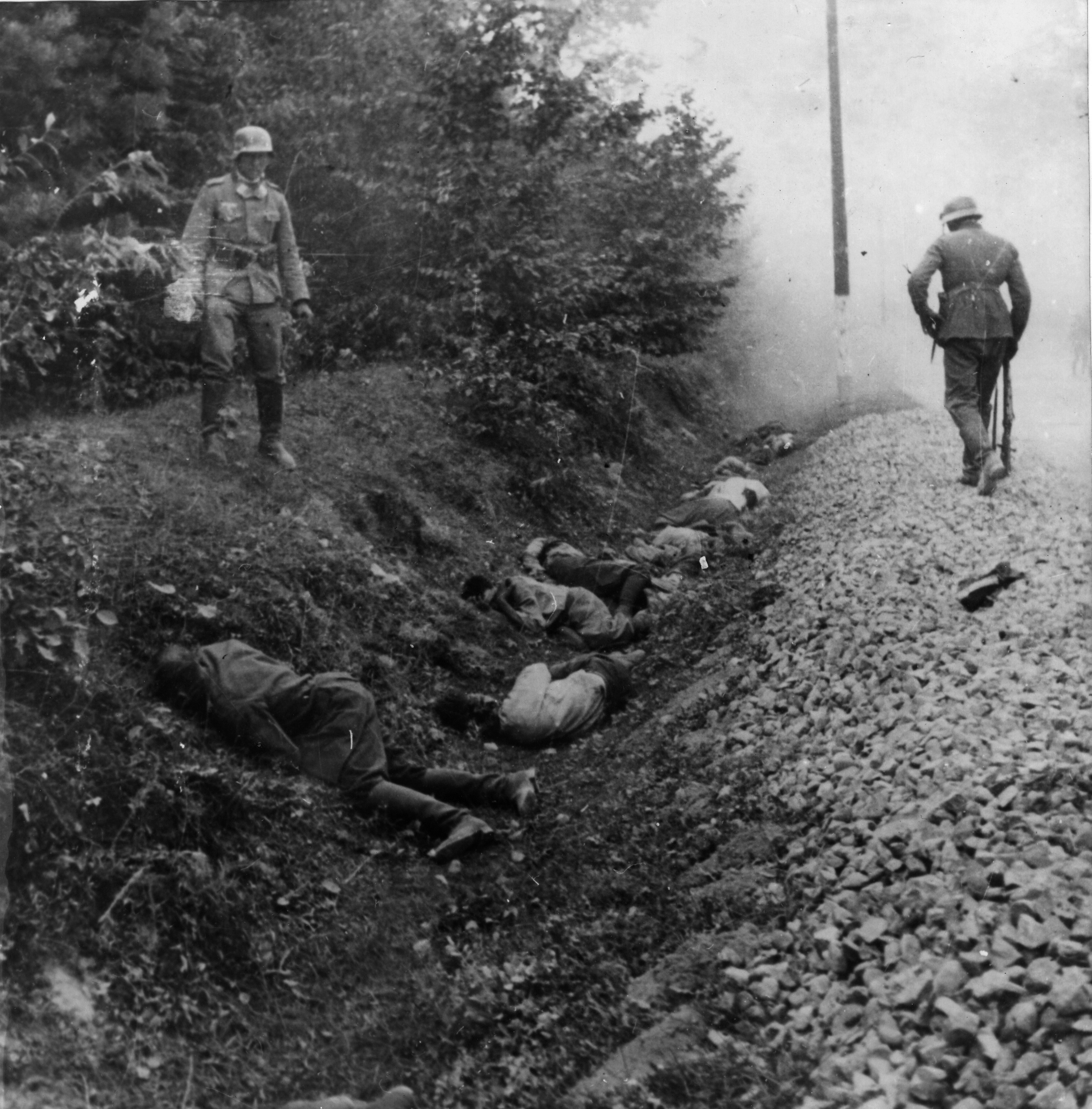
Polish prisoners of war murdered near Ciepielów, 8 September 1939

Nazi Germany's invasion of Poland in 1939 was characterized by mass murders of civilians and prisoners of war, attacks on undefended civilian targets, rapes, looting, destruction of property, and other severe violations of the international humanitarian law committed by German military, police, and paramilitary formations.

The advance of Wehrmacht units into Poland was accompanied by a wave of violence. In retaliation for alleged partisan attacks or resistance from Polish troops, German soldiers repeatedly burned villages and settlements, murdering their inhabitants. It is estimated that in September 1939, 434 or 476 Polish villages were destroyed. Massacres and retaliatory executions also took place in cities, particularly in Bydgoszcz and Częstochowa. War crimes against Polish prisoners of war occurred in all operational areas. In towns inhabited by Jews, German soldiers carried out so-called "swift pogroms", often involving mass killings, looting, and synagogue burnings. The Luftwaffe repeatedly targeted civilian sites, including undefended towns, hospitals, churches, historic buildings, as well as evacuation trains and refugees on the roads. The German army also faced serious disciplinary issues, leading to widespread looting and sexual violence.

Following the Wehrmacht's advance, the Einsatzgruppen carried out mass arrests and executions in newly occupied territories. Their victims were primarily members of the so-called Polish leadership class and Jewish civilians.

It is estimated that between 1 September and 25 October 1939, when military administration on occupied Polish territory was abolished, the Wehrmacht, SS, Ordnungspolizei, Volksdeutscher Selbstschutz, and other German formations carried out 714 executions, resulting in the deaths of approximately 16,000 civilians. Over 12,000 victims – nearly 75% – were murdered in September 1939 alone. At least 3,000 captured Polish soldiers were executed away from combat zones. Additionally, tens of thousands of civilians lost their lives due to German air raids and artillery shelling.

== Origins ==
=== Adolf Hitler's plans regarding Poland ===
For Adolf Hitler and other Nazi leaders, the war with Poland was not viewed as a conventional military conflict, but as an operation aimed at bringing about far-reaching territorial and demographic changes in Central and Eastern Europe. These intentions were not concealed from the highest commanders of the Wehrmacht. On 10 February 1939, even before the outbreak of the open crisis in Polish-German relations, Hitler delivered a speech to generals in which he stated that "the next war will have a purely ideological character, meaning it will be a national and racial war".

On 25 March 1939, Hitler told the Commander-in-Chief of the Army, General Walther von Brauchitsch, that "Poland will have to be destroyed in such a way that in the following decades it will not be considered as a political factor". Later, during a meeting with the highest Wehrmacht commanders on 23 May of the same year, he emphasized that the goal of the planned aggression would not be solely the recovery of Gdańsk and other territories of the former Prussian Partition, but the "expansion of living space in the East and securing food for our nation". He was not hiding that elements of the policy towards the conquered country would involve mass resettlements and the extensive use of forced labor. Additionally, on 14 August, in a conversation with Generals von Brauchitsch and Franz Halder, he stated that he intended to break Poland in a way deeper than a military defeat. These announcements raised no objections among the German general staff; their concerns were only about the possibility of a war with Western powers.

On 22 August 1939, the highest commanders of the Wehrmacht gathered at Hitler's summer residence in Obersalzberg. The meeting was secret, and note-taking was strictly forbidden. However, the speech Hitler delivered that day has been preserved in five versions. Admiral Wilhelm Canaris, whose notes are considered the most reliable, recorded Hitler's words, stating that the upcoming conflict would be a "war of annihilation" and its goal was the "total destruction of Poland". Hitler also allegedly ordered his generals:

Be merciless! Be brutal! 80 million people must get what they deserve, and they deserve the assurance of their existence. The law is on the side of the stronger. We must act with the utmost severity.

According to another version, (Note: Its credibility is sometimes questioned. However, on 25 August 1939, Admiral Wilhelm Canaris, in a conversation with General Franz Halder, expressed his "concern about the role of the Totenkopfverbände", which, according to Jochen Böhler, may indicate that these words were indeed spoken (Böhler (2011, p. 72)).) Hitler was quoted as having said:

I have prepared, for now, on the East only, the Totenkopf units and ordered them to kill without mercy or pardon the men, women, and children of Polish descent and the Polish language. Only in this way will we gain the living space we need.

=== Attitude of Wehrmacht soldiers and commanders towards the people of Poland ===
Jochen Böhler, analyzing the criminal behavior of Wehrmacht soldiers towards Polish civilians and prisoners of war in September 1939, concluded that it resulted from a combination of motivational, situational, and psychological factors. He points out the following:

- Nazi indoctrination, to which soldiers were subjected both during basic training in the Wehrmacht and in institutions they encountered before starting active military service, such as the Hitler Youth, Sturmabteilung, Reich Labour Service, etc.
- Deeply rooted anti-Semitic, anti-Polish, and anti-Slavic prejudices and stereotypes, which were further reinforced by Nazi propaganda that exploited, among other things, the alleged persecution of the German minority in Poland.
- Exposure to the poor living conditions in Poland, which strengthened soldiers' prejudices, including the belief in the "civilizational inferiority" and "demoralization" of the local population. The consequence was insensitivity to their suffering and a reduction in resistance to the use of violence. (Note: Böhler (2009, p. 52) points out in this context a letter from a certain non-commissioned officer, who did not perceive setting fire to thatched-roof rural cottages (described by him as "bedbug dwellings") as a reprehensible act.) Contact with Eastern European Jews (Ostjuden), often orthodox practitioners of Judaism, who differed greatly in clothing and customs from German Jews, contributed to the intensification of anti-Semitic sentiments within the Wehrmacht.
- Lack of combat experience among most German soldiers, leading to excessive nervousness and aggression, which found expression in violence against POWs and civilians.

Anti-Polish and anti-Semitic prejudices were also reflected in instructions and directives given to soldiers before the war broke out. The German command expected, in particular, that the invading forces would have to deal with numerous acts of sabotage and active participation by the civilian population in combat actions. Such an attitude was based on both the experiences gained during the Silesian Uprisings and the deeply rooted fear of partisans in German military tradition, (Note: To some extent, it was also present in the Austrian military tradition, and its roots dated back to the Serbian campaign during World War I. These experiences may have had some influence on the actions of those Wehrmacht mountain units fighting in Poland, which originated from the former Austrian army (Böhler (2009, p. 171)).) dating back to the Franco-Prussian War.

In the Instruction on the Polish Way of Conducting War (Merkblatt über Eigenarten der polnischen Kriegsführung), issued by the Foreign Armies East Department on 1 July 1939, there were warnings that Poles were "fanatically stirred up" (for which "the Catholic clergy is usually responsible"), "kind treatment would quickly be seen as a sign of weakness", and Jews "see Germans as their personal enemies, but for money, they are capable of anything". This document also warned about possible acts of sabotage, including the destruction and poisoning of food supplies. In a directive issued by the Oberkommando der Wehrmacht, which was sent to divisional-level units in the last days of August 1939, it was warned that "cruelty, brutality, treachery, and lies are methods of combat that an enraged Pole uses instead of quiet strength". At the same time, a special order from the 8th Army command for rear services on 24 August 1939 recommended not to trust Poles and Jews living in the defeated areas, but to treat them as enemies accordingly.

The expected resistance of the civilian population was to be suppressed in an "energetic and ruthless" manner. On 9 August 1939, the Oberkommando des Heeres issued an order recommending that "as soon as the situation on the front allows", all able-bodied men of Polish and Jewish nationality aged 17 to 45 should be interned and treated as prisoners of war.

Warnings of possible partisan attacks were also issued at lower levels, including by the command of individual divisions and even regiments. For example, on the day of the outbreak of hostilities, the commander of the 20th Infantry Regiment of the 10th Infantry Division ordered his soldiers: "Do not be gullible, but treat every Polish citizen as a fanatical enemy who will fight you by all means! [...] Be ruthless to every partisan you encounter with a weapon in hand!".

As reality showed, these types of orders and warnings significantly increased the nervousness of inexperienced German soldiers, intensifying their readiness to use violence against civilians and POWs.

== Operation Tannenberg ==
=== Preparations and objectives ===
On 22 May 1939, the so-called Zentralstelle II P was established in the Main Office of the Security Service (SD-Hauptamt). Its task was to register Germans living in Poland, (Note: Primarily with the aim of identifying potential informants (Böhler (2011, p. 60)).) Poles living in the Third Reich, as well as those Poles residing in Poland who had "distinguished themselves in national struggles" or were involved in promoting Polishness in Germany. It was assumed that the files of section II P would be "made available to a potential operational group". Information was also collected on Polish Jews, with the SD's Jewish Affairs Department (II 112) participating in this effort.

In July and August 1939, SS-Brigadeführer Werner Best – working closely with SD foreign intelligence chief Walter Schellenberg and using the departments subordinate to him in the Office of Administration and Law at the Main Office of the Sicherheitspolizei (Hauptamt Sicherheitspolizei), as well as Department I of the Gestapo (Gestapo Amt) – created the normative, personnel, and technical framework for the SD and Sicherheitspolizei operational groups (Einsatzgruppen), which were to operate behind each of the Wehrmacht armies participating in the invasion of Poland.

By the end of August 1939, five Einsatzgruppen had been formed, numbered from I to V. In early September, after the war had already begun, two additional operational groups were established: Einsatzgruppe VI and Einsatzgruppe zur besonderen Verwendung, along with an independent unit, Einsatzkommando 16. The actions carried out by the SD and security police in Poland were given the codename Tannenberg. The name Unternehmen "Tannenberg" (Operation Tannenberg) was also used for a special department within the Main Office of the Security Police, created to coordinate the actions of the Einsatzgruppen.

Even before the outbreak of the war, the so-called Sonderfahndungsliste ("Special Wanted List for Poland") and other proscription lists were compiled, based in part on information obtained from German informants in Poland. These lists contained data on Polish citizens who were to be arrested by Einsatzgruppen. The original Sonderfahndungsliste has not been found. In Polish historical literature, there was a long-standing belief that the proscription list prepared before the war was called Sonderfahndungsbuch Polen ("Special Prosecution Book – Poland"). However, the document bearing this title, which was discovered after the war, was most likely issued only in December 1939.

The Guidelines for Sicherheitspolizei and SD Operations Abroad from 31 July 1939 stated that the task of the Einsatzgruppen would be "to combat all elements hostile to the Reich and Germans in the rear of the fighting troops in enemy territory". Orders issued after the outbreak of war specified that the duties of the Einsatzgruppen would include, among other things, "apprehending politically unreliable persons", particularly "those listed on transmitted wanted lists", "confiscating weapons, securing documents important to the police […] apprehending fugitives". The Wehrmacht command was probably not privy to the exact details of the Einsatzgruppen's tasks, but it likely realized on the eve of war that their actions would be criminal in nature, going far beyond ensuring security in the rear of fighting troops.

The decision-making processes that ultimately led to the large-scale extermination of the Polish intelligentsia remain difficult to reconstruct. During the Briefing of Commanders for the Large-Scale Operation of the Security Police (Unterweisung der Führer eines Grosseinsatzes der Sicherheitspolizei), which took place on 18 August 1939 in Berlin, no explicit order for the extermination of the Polish intelligentsia was given. However, there was no doubt left that it would constitute the driving force behind Polish resistance. According to the testimony of Lothar Beutel, confirmed by Ernst Gerke, the Einsatzgruppen commanders were instructed at that time that in the fight against the Polish resistance movement, "all methods were permitted, including executions and arrests", with individual commanders deciding on the spot which measures to apply.

Even before the war began, the Einsatzgruppen might received an oral order to carry out executions. However, the authors of the monograph Einsatzgruppen in Poland suggest that German plans initially did not include the direct extermination of the "Polish leadership class". Entries from General Franz Halder's diary, dated 29 August 1939, indicate that the task of the Einsatzgruppen was initially to arrest 10,000 people, then 20,000, and subsequently deport them to concentration camps. During a meeting of department heads at the Main Office of the Security Police in Berlin on 7 September 1939, it was emphasized that "the leadership class of the Polish population should be neutralized as far as possible". However, it was also noted that "the leadership class, which under no circumstances can remain in Poland, will be placed in German concentration camps, while lower social strata will be placed in provisional camps near the border, in the rear of the operational groups, which will be able to transfer [these] people immediately to the remaining remnants of Poland as needed".

Nevertheless, Nazi policy quickly radicalized. Statements from the highest SS and Wehrmacht commanders indicate that already in the first half of September 1939, Hitler issued an order for the physical extermination of the Polish aristocracy, intelligentsia, and clergy. From that moment on, the Einsatzgruppen began to gain independence from the Wehrmacht, while the brutality of their actions escalated dramatically.

=== Course of events ===
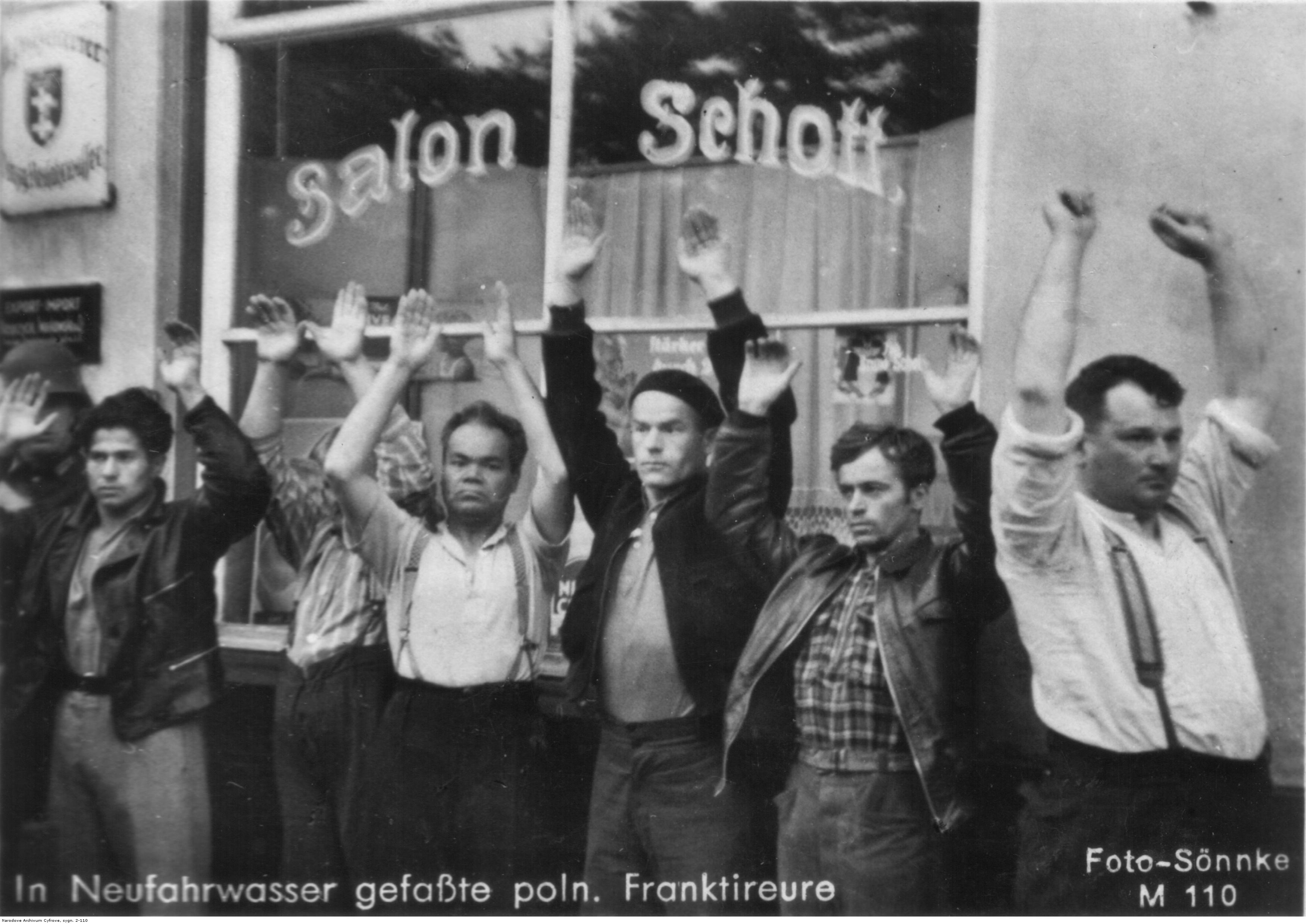
Poles arrested in the first days of the war in the Free City of Danzig

From the very first minutes of the war, units of the local police and SA in the Free City of Danzig carried out mass arrests of Poles – activists of the local Polish community and employees of Polish state institutions. Many of those arrested were sent to the Stutthof concentration camp near Danzig, whose construction began on 2 September 1939. In Szymankowo, officers of the Danzig police and SA murdered 14 Polish railway workers along with their families. This was in retaliation for diverting a German armored train onto a dead-end track, which allowed Polish soldiers to destroy a strategically important bridge over the Vistula river in Tczew.

The Einsatzgruppen, following in the wake of the advancing German forces, carried out mass arrests in newly occupied cities and towns. Polish civilian defenders whom the Wehrmacht had not yet captured and executed were detained and murdered. Arrests also targeted individuals listed in the Sonderfahndungsbuch Polen and those denounced by local Volksdeutsche. According to guidelines stating that "any Pole who has fled cannot return", refugees from western provinces attempting to return home were executed. Einsatzgruppen officers conducted house searches for weapons and searched public buildings and offices of political and social organizations, seeking documentation and records to identify their members. They were also responsible for taking control of industrial facilities and confiscating various material goods, including raw materials (such as gasoline, diesel fuel, and wood), cash and foreign currency in banks, museum collections, and library holdings.

The Einsatzgruppen were supported by other SS units, as well as by the Ordnungspolizei and the Volksdeutscher Selbstschutz, which was established in early September. The makeshift camps they set up ("transit camps for civilian prisoners", "collection camps", "internment camps") were the first German camps to be established on occupied Polish territory.

In the first week of September, executions carried out by the Einsatzgruppen were still relatively few, especially in comparison to the massacres and executions committed at that time by the Wehrmacht. However, their numbers began to rise in the following weeks. The highest number of crimes was recorded in Upper Silesia, Pomerelia, Greater Poland, and West Galicia – regions where two or even three Einsatzgruppen sometimes operated simultaneously or successively.

In the brutal pacification of Bydgoszcz, conducted jointly with the Wehrmacht from 5 to 12 September, subunits of Einsatzgruppe IV took part. After their departure, a detachment of Einsatzkommando 16 arrived in the city, whose officers executed members of the City Council and many activists of the local structures of the Polish Western Union at the end of September. Near Kartuzy, officers of EK 16 and local Germans from the Selbstschutz murdered at least several dozen people in September, including around 20 members of the Polish Western Union and 10 Catholic priests who had been arrested in the Kartuzy County. In Starogard Gdański and the surrounding area, approximately 150 Poles were executed in September.

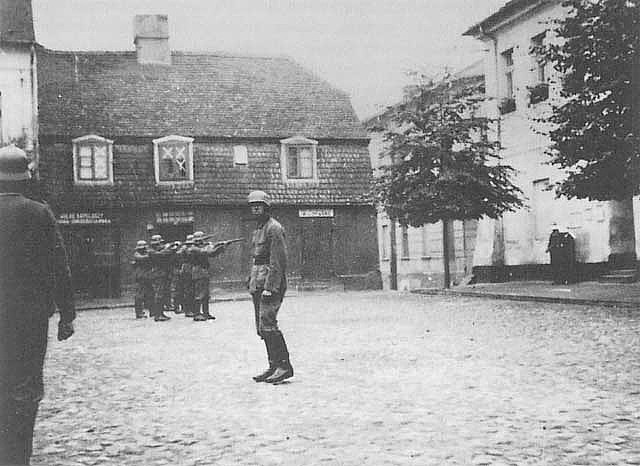
Public execution of two hostages in Konin, 22 September 1939

In Greater Poland, executions took place in Budzyń (11, 13, and 29 September; 7 victims), Damasławek (7 September; 5 victims), Murowana Goślina (18 September; 4 victims), near Rogoźno (17–19 and 24–25 September; over 40 victims), Łopiszewo (14 and 21 September; 6 victims). Executions of Polish civilian prisoners and hostages were also carried out in Różopole near Ślesin (16 September, 18 victims), Środa Wielkopolska (17 September; 21 victims) and also in Śmigiel and Kościan (30 September and 2 October; 16 victims in total). On September 17, a dozen people were shot in one of the squares in Turek. Executions continued there until November, with the total number of victims estimated at around 300. Some executions were public, such as those on 22 September in Konin, where two hostages (a Pole and a Jew) were murdered.

In Greater Poland and Upper Silesia, the pretext for persecuting Poles and Jews was a supposed "Polish uprising". In Lubliniec, for instance, Einsatzgruppe II executed 164 or 180 alleged "insurgents and looters" around 17 September. Meanwhile, in Lesser Poland and Outer Subcarpathia, the main target of the Einsatzgruppen was the Jewish population.

The reinforcement of rear-area security forces with police and paramilitary formations such as the Einsatzgruppen, SS-Verfügungstruppe, SS-Totenkopfverbände, and Volksdeutscher Selbstschutz was met with approval by the German general staff. At the same time, alarmist military reports about an alleged developing partisan war behind the front lines served as a pretext for SS leadership to escalate repressive measures against Polish and Jewish civilians. As early as 3 September, Reichsführer-SS Heinrich Himmler ordered the Einsatzgruppen to immediately execute "Polish insurgents caught in the act or found with weapons in hand". Initially, military protests against the crimes committed by the Einsatzgruppen stemmed only from the belief that these were undisciplined excesses. However, once it became clear that mass executions were being carried out on the basis of higher orders, criticism from the Wehrmacht fell silent.

On 20 November 1939, the Einsatzgruppen were officially disbanded. Based on them, the first stationary SD and Sicherheitspolizei offices in occupied Poland were established. It is estimated that by the end of 1939, the number of people murdered in occupied Poland by or with the participation of Einsatzgruppen officers was around 47,000, including approximately 7,000 Jews.

== Crimes against prisoners of war ==
=== Massacres and executions ===
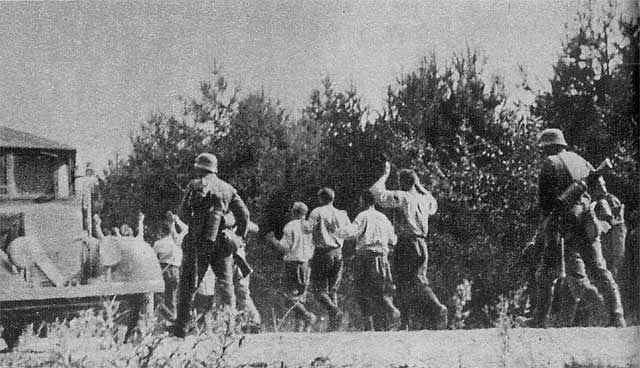
Ciepielów, 8 September 1939. Polish prisoners of war led to execution

Before the invasion of Poland began, the German command did not issue official orders mandating the murder of prisoners of war. Nevertheless, the execution of captured Polish Armed Forces soldiers was a widespread phenomenon, occurring throughout all operational areas of the Wehrmacht in September 1939. Szymon Datner recorded at least 32 cases of executions and massacres of Polish POWs. Such crimes took place both immediately after combat and at assembly points or in makeshift prisoner camps. It is estimated that in September 1939, over 3,000 Polish Armed Forces soldiers were killed away from active combat zones.

According to Jochen Böhler, crimes against Polish POWs were generally spontaneous. He attributes them, as with crimes against civilians, to a combination of motivational and situational factors. Böhler emphasizes that traditional anti-Slavic prejudices were compounded by the inexperience of German soldiers. The Polish method of combat – using delaying tactics in forests or buildings in response to the enemy's numerical and technological superiority – was perceived by the Germans as "dishonest" and "treacherous". In retaliation for losses suffered in such encounters, German troops carried out mass and individual executions of Polish POWs.

Some executions of POWs were acts of vengeance for alleged Polish excesses against members of the German minority. There were also cases where nervous and inexperienced German guards struggled to control large groups of POWs, leading to brutal and disproportionate reactions to real or imagined escape attempts. Additionally, Polish soldiers from broken units who, due to the rapid advance of the Wehrmacht, found themselves behind enemy lines were not considered members of the regular armed forces but rather "partisans". This approach was sanctioned by an Oberkommando des Heeres decree issued on 12 September 1939. Inspired by Hitler himself, this document – despite ongoing hostilities – prohibited non-Germans from possessing any weapons in occupied territories west of the San and central Vistula rivers, as well as north of the Narew.

During the night of 4–5 September, near Serock, soldiers of the German 604th Road Construction Battalion unexpectedly opened fire on a crowd of POWs from the Pomeranian Army. In the ensuing chaos, between 69 and 84 Polish soldiers and interned civilians were killed. On 6 September, near the village of Moryca, the Germans executed 19 officers of the 76th Infantry Regiment. Additionally, a number of enlisted soldiers from this regiment were burned alive in Moryca and the nearby Longinówka. On 8 September, near Ciepielów, soldiers of the German 29th Infantry Division carried out several executions of prisoners of war. It is generally accepted that this most notorious crime of the September Campaign claimed around 300 Polish soldiers (primarily from the 74th Infantry Regiment), though the actual number of victims was likely lower. On 10 September, in the courtyard of a church in Piaseczno, 15 prisoners of war were executed (some sources claim the number was 21). On 12 September, in the building of a public school in Szczucin, Wehrmacht soldiers burned alive or shot at least 40 Polish POWs. In the same massacre, around 30 civilian refugees and 25 local Jews were also murdered. During the night of 13–14 September, in the barracks square in Zambrów, German guards opened fire on Polish POWs after a stampede was triggered by frightened horses. Around 200 POWs were killed in the chaos, and another 100 were wounded. On 18 September, near Śladów by the Vistula river, the Germans massacred captured soldiers of the Poznań and Pomeranian armies, as well as civilians – local residents and refugees. According to Szymon Datner's research, the estimated number of victims was around 300, though the actual figure may have been lower. On 20 September, in retaliation for the alleged mutilation of a German soldier by Poles, 42 POWs were executed in Majdan Wielki. On 22 September, in a barn in the village of Urych, Wehrmacht soldiers burned alive between 73 and 100 POWs – soldiers of the 4th Podhale Rifles Regiment. On the same day, in Boryszew near Sochaczew, 50 soldiers from the Bydgoszcz National Defense Battalion were executed in retaliation for their supposed involvement in the killings of Volksdeutsche during Bydgoszcz's so-called Bloody Sunday events. On 26 September, during an assault on Warsaw's Ochota district, the Germans – according to eyewitness accounts – used Polish POWs as "human shields", forcing them to march in front of their tanks. Many POWs perished in the crossfire. On 28 September, in Zakroczym, SS troops from the Panzer Division Kempf, despite an ongoing ceasefire, unexpectedly attacked defenders of the Modlin Fortress as they prepared to surrender. According to estimates, several hundred Polish soldiers and about 100 civilians were killed. Executions of Polish POWs also took place in Mszczonów (8 September, 11 victims) and Stare Kozłowice (12 September, 5 victims).

It was very common for captured members of the Civic Guard, young scouts, and members of other self-defense or paramilitary formations to be executed – despite their combatant status being clearly indicated by uniforms and insignia in accordance with the Hague Convention. Between 9 and 11 September, in four towns in Greater Poland – Gniezno, Mogilno, Trzemeszno, and Kłecko – soldiers of the German border guard from Grenzschutz-Abschnitts-Kommando 2 executed between 417 and 500 captured Polish defenders as alleged "partisans". Among the victims were members of the Civic Guard, National Defense soldiers, members of the Military Training and Volunteer Fire Brigade, scouts, and refugees from other counties. In Kalisz and its surroundings, at least several dozen civilian defenders were executed in the first days of September. On 5 October, under a summary court-martial ruling, 39 captured defenders of the Polish Post Office in Gdańsk were executed in Zaspa near Gdańsk. The remaining 23 were deported to concentration camps.

There are accounts indicating that Jewish soldiers were singled out from groups of POWs and executed immediately. However, the total number of victims of such executions remains unknown.

=== Treatment in prisoner-of-war and transit camps ===
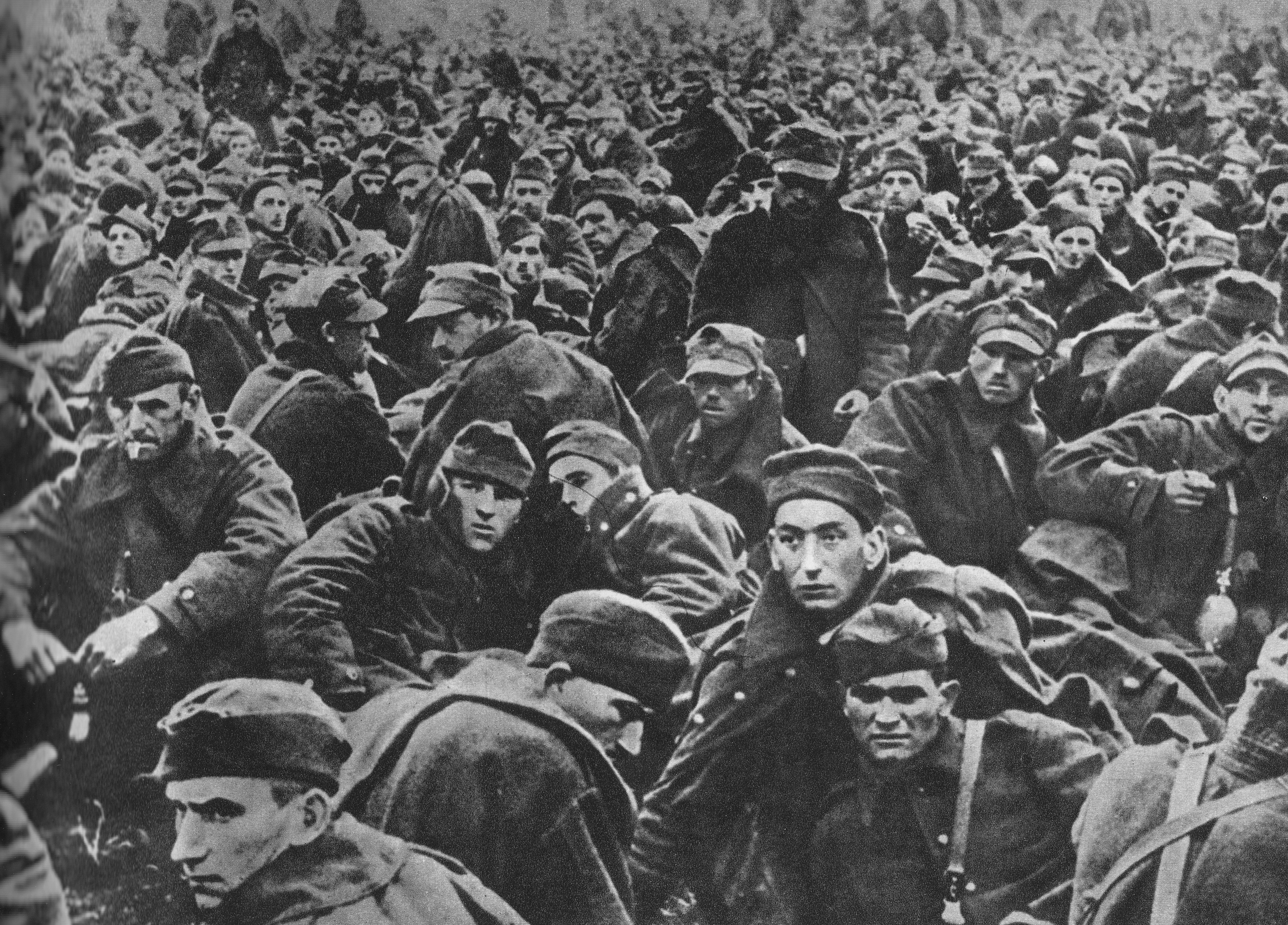
Polish soldiers taken prisoner in September 1939

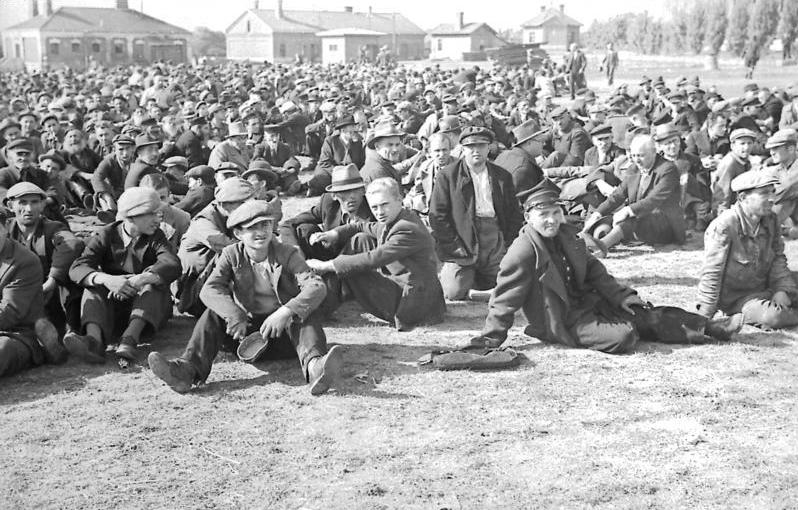
Polish and Jewish men interned by the Germans in Lublin

In September 1939, the German system of prisoner-of-war camps proved inadequate for the challenges it faced. The Germans struggled with transporting POWs and internees. The prisoner-of-war and transit camps lacked sufficient food, medical supplies, and proper sanitary facilities. As early as 8 September, the command of the German VII Army Corps raised the alarm that "the situation behind the front is indescribable", and over 6,000 POWs and internees "receive no food whatsoever". Other operational units reported similar problems.

The proper treatment of POWs was hindered by orders issued by the German command. For example, on 18 September, the commander of the 14th Army, General Wilhelm List, issued an order in which he considered "inappropriate behavior [by German] soldiers fraternizing with prisoners in assembly points and prisoner-of-war camps" as a sign of a lack of military discipline. It was also common for Polish POWs to be forced to work for the German military and civilian authorities.

In many locations, in accordance with the directives of the Oberkommando des Heeres from 9 August 1939, men aged 17 to 45 were interned on a mass scale. The influx of these men created additional chaos and increased the burden on the German prisoner-of-war camps. On 16 September, the command of the XI Army Corps had to take the decision on their own responsibility to intern only those civilians who were "reasonably suspected of being soldiers disguised in civilian clothes". After the cessation of hostilities, most "civilian prisoners" were released to their homes. However, some were deported to camps in Germany, especially to East Prussia.

On 16 February 1939, more than six months before the outbreak of the war, an instruction was issued that mandated dividing incoming POWs according to Nazi racial criteria. In the transit camps, and especially in the permanent prisoner-of-war camps, Polish soldiers of Jewish descent were separated from other prisoners. Special "internal ghettos" were created for them. Jewish prisoners were fed and treated worse, and were often forced into exhausting and degrading labor. As a result, the mortality rate among them was significantly higher than among other prisoners.

== Massacres of civilians and punitive operations ==
=== "Partisan delusions" ===
Almost from the very first hours of the war, German units across all sectors of the front reported alleged attacks by partisans on a massive scale. In reality, however, the Wehrmacht was facing an imaginary enemy. During the September Campaign, no organized armed resistance movement involving large segments of the Polish population existed. Nor was there a spontaneous uprising of civilians against the advancing Germans. This is evidenced by the fact that German army and police records from September 1939 do not contain a single name of a Polish civilian captured with a weapon in hand. Even detailed investigations carried out by the German Geheime Feldpolizei into the alleged partisan attacks failed to find evidence confirming civilian participation in combat operations.

In the early days of the war, there were numerous instances of uncontrolled exchanges of fire in various locations, caused by the nervousness and inexperience of German recruits. Among Wehrmacht soldiers, who harbored anti-Slavic and antisemitic prejudices – reinforced by pre-war warnings about the supposed danger posed by civilians – such incidents only strengthened their belief in the omnipresence of partisans. As a result, civilians were almost always held responsible for the alleged attacks and subjected to punishment.

Jews were often suspected of involvement in these supposed "partisan attacks", as were specific social groups such as the Catholic clergy or laborers. However, German soldiers were generally prepared to apply repressive measures against the entire population of a given operational area.

=== Pacifications of villages ===
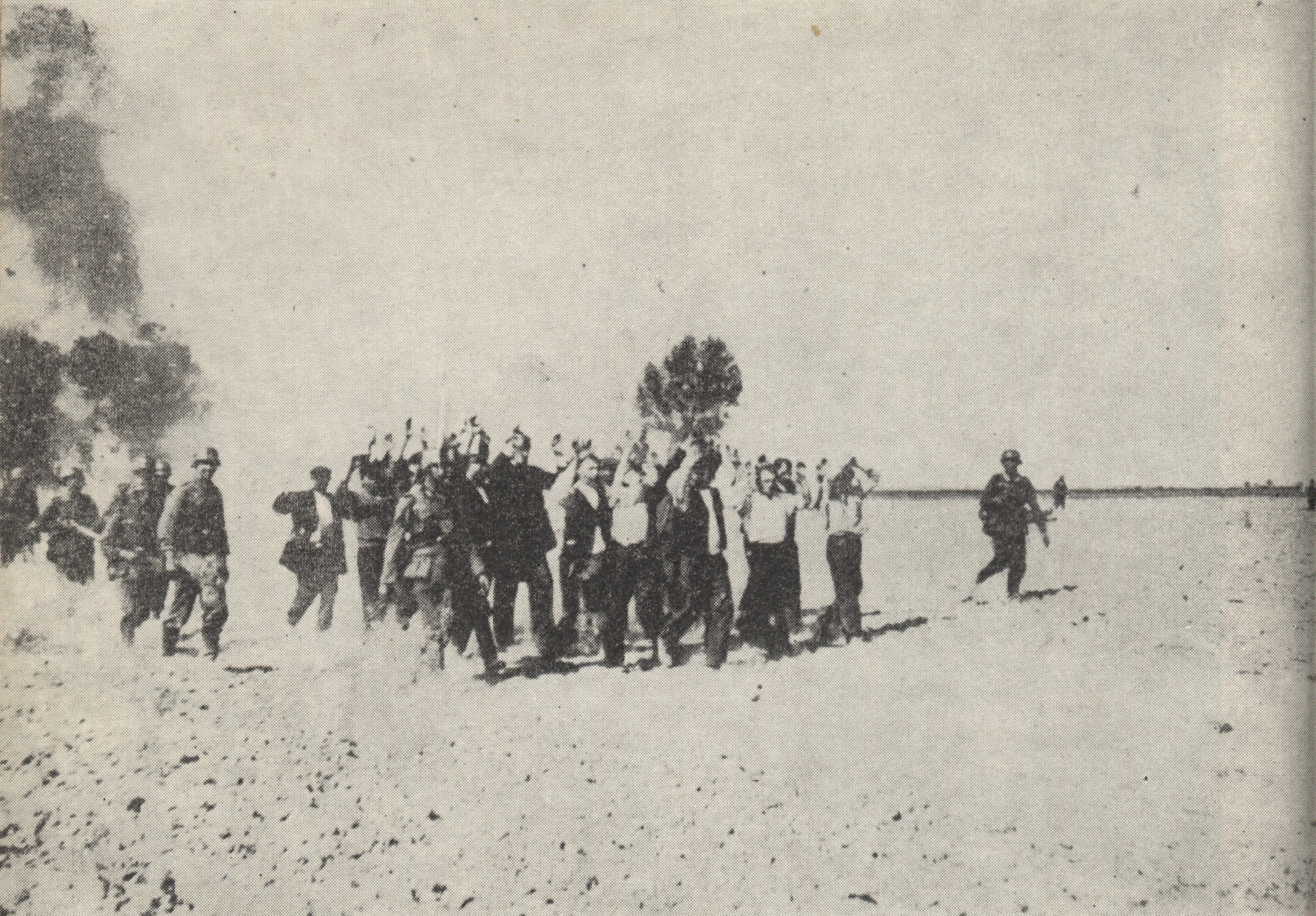
September 1939, Polish peasants led to execution. A burning village in the background

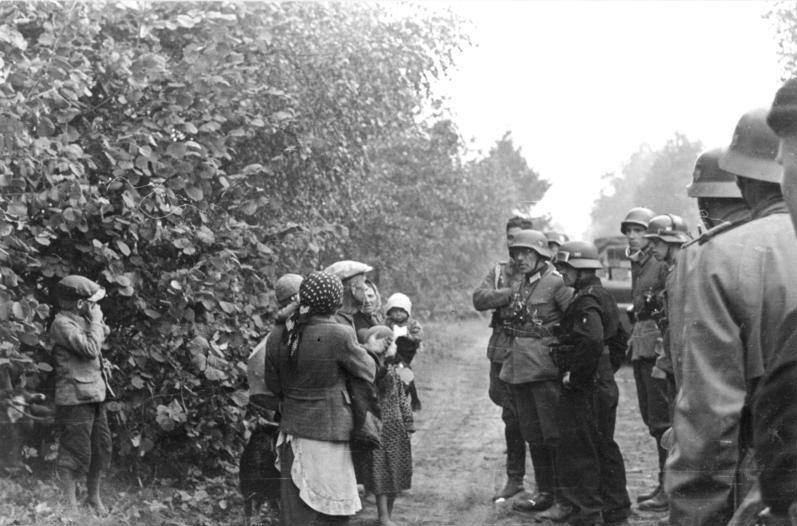
German soldiers talking with Polish farmers

The authors of Nazi Crimes in the Polish Countryside 1939–1945 state that during the defensive war of 1939, German forces burned down 434 villages. According to other sources, as many as 476 settlements may have been destroyed. The Łódź region was particularly affected. According to Andrzej Jankowski, in September 1939, the Germans pacified 93 villages there, killing approximately 1,200 people. Szymon Datner and the authors of Nazi Crimes in the Polish Countryside 1939–1945 claim that 201 villages were burned in the post-war Łódź Voivodeship. (Note: For the remaining voivodeships, the statistics were as follows: Warsaw – 116 villages, Kraków – 42 villages, Kielce – 40 villages, Lublin – 30 villages, Silesian – 22 villages, Pomeranian – 18 villages, Poznań – 4 villages, Rzeszów – 3 villages. The authors noted that these figures were incomplete (Fajkowski & Religa (1981, p. 15); Datner (1967, p. 86)).)

In the pre-war Białystok Voivodeship, 49 villages were either completely or partially burned down, with 30 of them pacified by the Germans without any clear connection to military operations. In 31 villages, 197 people were killed, 112 houses and 2,535 farm buildings were burned.

The pattern of many pacifications was very similar. If, during a march or a stop, an exchange of fire broke out – often due to the inexperience and nervousness of young German recruits – Wehrmacht soldiers immediately interpreted the incident as a "partisan attack" and responded with brutal reprisals. They set buildings on fire, threw grenades into basements, and executed residents. However, this was not always the case. In some instances, villages were destroyed in retaliation for the resistance put up by Polish Armed Forces soldiers, especially if they had used the village buildings as defensive positions. General Franciszek Skibiński, chief of staff of the 10th Motorized Cavalry Brigade, believed that burning villages served to increase chaos on the Polish side while simultaneously providing advancing German units with illumination at night. Datner, on the other hand, argued that the burning of villages and towns was a deliberate tactic aimed at terrorizing the population and paralyzing any will to resist.

Burning villages was often accompanied by massacres and mass executions. For instance, on the very first day of the war, soldiers of the German 19th Infantry Division completely burned down the border villages of Zimnowoda and Parzymiechy. Historians estimate that between 113 and 191 people were murdered in both settlements, including many women and children. During the night of September 1–2 in Torzeniec, a violent exchange of fire occurred, resulting in the deaths of three German soldiers and injuries to four others. In retaliation, soldiers of the 41st Infantry Regiment of the 10th Infantry Division partially burned the village and murdered 16 residents. The following day, on the orders of the regiment's commander, Colonel Friedrich Gollwitzer, 18 Polish men were executed in Torzeniec. On September 2, a pioneer battalion of the same division pacified the neighboring village of Wyszanów. A total of 22 people – mostly women, children, and the elderly – were killed by gunfire, fire, and grenades thrown into basements. Between September 1 and 2, in Gostyń, Upper Silesia, the Wehrmacht executed 14 residents.

On September 3, in Świekatowo in the Tuchola Forest, 22 residents were executed in several mass shootings (according to other sources, the number of victims was 26). That same day, in Mączniki in Greater Poland, 19 people, including children, were killed by soldiers of the 24th Infantry Division. The village, along with neighboring Ostrów Kaliski, was set on fire. In Lesser Poland, within the operational area of the German XVIII Army Corps, Skomielna Biała was burned down, and 14 residents were murdered. In Olszówka, located several kilometers away, 18 farms were burned, and 13 people were killed. Also on September 3, Mysłów fell victim to pacification, where 22 people died from German bullets and flames, as well as Nierada and Zrębice, where 25 people were murdered.

On September 4, in Kruszyna, in retaliation for the death of a German soldier (mistakenly shot by his comrades), between 37 and 44 residents were killed. That same day, in Kamieńsk, likely as revenge for a successful raid by the Polish 2nd Mounted Rifle Regiment, the Germans executed between 25 and 33 men. Also on September 4, in Szczawno, 18 Poles were executed in two shootings. The next day, in Rudnik, probably as retaliation for resistance from Polish soldiers, 23 residents were executed. On the night of September 5–6, an unexplained exchange of fire occurred in Kajetanowice. Even though no Germans were harmed, soldiers of the 46th Infantry Division burned the village to the ground and murdered between 72 and 80 residents.

During these days, German mountain units advancing from Slovakia committed many crimes. Between September 5 and 7, in Świniarsko near Nowy Sącz, soldiers of the 2nd Mountain Division, likely avenging Polish resistance, burned several buildings and murdered a dozen or so civilians. On September 6, the Szczyrzyc massacre took place, claiming around 10 civilian victims and 39 POWs. On the night of September 8–9, soldiers of the 1st Mountain Division partially burned Besko, killing 21 residents (among the victims were both Poles and Ukrainians). This crime was likely committed in revenge for a defeat suffered by the German mountain troops in a clash near Równe. At this time, village pacifications also occurred in the Kielce Land. On September 6, in Krasna and Komorów, soldiers of the German 13th Motorized Infantry Division murdered 28 civilians, including women and children, and deliberately burned down the latter village. That same day, in Charsznica, German units executed 32 people.

Between September 6 and 8, advancing Wehrmacht units pacified numerous villages in Gmina Niewiesz: Borzewisko (6 victims), Dominikowice (29 victims), Grocholice (several victims), Gibaszew and Izabela (several victims), Józefów (30 victims), Lipnica (17 victims), Niemysłów and Krępa (26 victims), Sempółki (at least 10 victims), Szarów (20 victims), and Wojciechów (8 victims). From Nowa Wieś, in the neighboring Gmina Poddębice, 15 farmers were taken to nearby Wylazłów and executed there. In some villages, arson occurred; for instance, Lipnica was almost entirely burned down.

On September 8, in a sandpit near Książki in the Chełmno Land, an SS unit executed 43 Poles. On the same day, Czekaj was completely burned down, and 19 residents were murdered. On September 10, in the villages of Teresin and Mszadla, as a result of arson and executions carried out by soldiers of the 10th Infantry Division, around 150 people were killed. Also on September 10, in the villages of Laski and Sokołowo in eastern Mazovia, in retaliation for a defeat suffered in battle with Polish forces, the Germans executed 20 people. On the same day, in Bądków and Bratoszewice near Stryków, 22 and 14 residents, respectively, were murdered. On September 12, executions took place in nearby Koźle and Sadówka, each claiming several victims. Also on September 12, the Wehrmacht murdered 21 residents in the village of Parma near Łowicz and burned several farms there. On September 13, in Cecylówka, German soldiers burned alive between 54 and 68 men from the village, including several Jews, in a barn. On the same day, in Seroczyn, SS soldiers from the Panzer Division Kempf executed or killed with grenades between 28 and 29 residents, including women and children. Between September 13 and 14, in Olszewo in Podlachia, in retaliation for actions by the Suwałki Cavalry Brigade, Wehrmacht soldiers murdered 47 people, including civilians and captured Polish soldiers. On September 15, in Cechówka (now part of Sulejówek), at least 58 civilians were killed by Wehrmacht soldiers. On the same day, the Germans pacified neighboring Długa Szlachecka, where they murdered 42 people. On September 16, Bąków Górny was pacified, and the following day, nearby Retki; in both villages, 18 and 31 people, respectively, were killed. On September 17, in Łaskarzew, after Polish forces were driven out of the village, soldiers of the 1st Infantry Division murdered 24 Poles and 30 Jews. On the same day, in Henryków, Wehrmacht soldiers killed 76 people, including many refugees from western Poland. On an undetermined day, in the villages of Księżopole and Tyszki-Ciągaczki, Wehrmacht soldiers executed 33 residents and refugees.

The German command quickly realized that the wave of violence caused by "partisan delusions" was spiraling out of control and threatening the interests of the Wehrmacht, including the loss of quarters and supplies. There was also concern that members of the German minority in Poland might accidentally fall victim to the soldiers' aggression. On September 2, the command of the 10th Infantry Division issued an order to "strictly forbid arson, which has already become a kind of mania". On September 4, the command of the XIII Army Corps, while emphasizing that "partisans must be treated without mercy", forbade retaliatory arson. The following day, an order with similar content came from the 8th Army command. On September 6, in a command issued by the IV Army Corps, it was noted that "panic shootings and huge fires break out over trivial reasons", adding that due to the lack of experience among soldiers and rear unit commanders, there was a danger of a "psychosis regarding partisans". Meanwhile, on September 11, the commander of the 10th Army, General Walter von Reichenau, ordered the cessation of nervousness among the soldiers and forbade "burning houses in retaliation", though he noted that "in the case of actual attacks on soldiers or any other hostile actions, appropriate measures must be taken immediately". However, no measure was implemented that could have effectively stopped the arson and executions, such as thorough investigations and severe punishment for the perpetrators.

Additionally, orders issued by German commanders sometimes sanctioned crimes committed by their subordinates or were at least internally contradictory. Instructions from the Oberkommando des Heeres ordered that captured partisans be brought before military courts. However, a special directive issued on September 4 regarding the supply of the 8th Army's rear services included a recommendation to execute without trial not only partisans and those found with weapons but also Polish civilians "found in homes and farms from which our soldiers were fired upon". On the same day, General von Reichenau issued an order to execute partisans "caught in the act or with weapons in hand". The Oberkommando des Heeres quickly issued a clarification to army commanders, stating that partisans should be killed in combat, but if captured, they should be brought to trial. Nevertheless, on September 10, the Oberkommando des Heeres ordered that Polish "juvenile criminals" be tried as adults if "the perpetrator does not differ in development from a person over 18 years old". On the same day, the commander of Army Group North, General Fedor von Bock, issued an order to burn down houses behind the front line from which shots were fired at German soldiers, and if it was impossible to determine which house the shots came from, to burn down the entire village (unless German soldiers were quartered there). The same order mandated that the village head (or, in his absence, "respected residents") be brought before a court on the grounds of "justified suspicion of complicity". (Note: Böhler (2009, pp. 159, 162) considers this order, as well as the earlier special directive on the supply of the 8th Army's rear services from September 4, to be the first "criminal orders" of the Wehrmacht during World War II.)

=== Massacres and "cleansing actions" in towns and cities ===
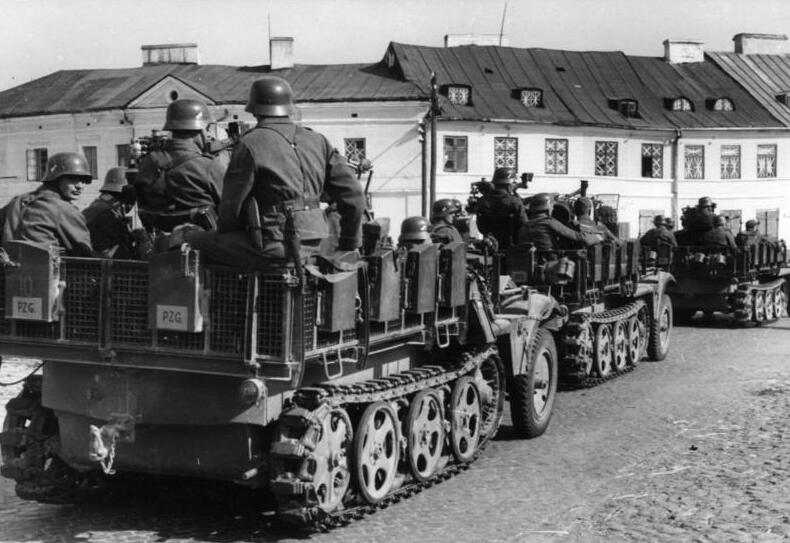
German troops entry into Częstochowa

On 3 September 1939, Wehrmacht units entered Częstochowa without encountering any resistance. Initial reports noted that "the residents remain calm". However, on the following day, in the early afternoon, sudden and violent gunfire broke out in two locations within the city. Chaos erupted among the German units, at times escalating into panic. Eight soldiers were killed, and another 14 were wounded. As soon as the gunfire ceased, the Germans thoroughly searched the surrounding houses, yet they failed to capture any Polish soldiers or partisans, nor did they find any weapons or ammunition. Most likely, these armed incidents resulted from the inexperience and excessive nervousness of German soldiers – heightened by reports from the first hours of the war about alleged partisan attacks and by warnings from their command regarding Częstochowa's working-class population, which was supposedly sympathetic to communism.

Nonetheless, soldiers of the 42nd Infantry Regiment of the 46th Infantry Division believed they had been attacked by partisans and initiated a large-scale retaliatory operation. Poles and Jews were dragged from their homes and herded into several improvised assembly points throughout the city. There, they were forced to lie face down for hours or stand with their hands raised. The assembled civilians were subjected to mistreatment, harassment, and intimidation. German soldiers were given verbal orders to shoot any detainee who attempted to move. Men were separated from women and children, then subjected to thorough searches. Anyone found carrying even a razor blade, straight razor, or pocketknife was taken aside and executed. These events became known in Częstochowa's history as Bloody Monday. The exact number of victims has never been precisely determined. During exhumations conducted in early 1940, bodies were found in various locations throughout the city – 194 men, 25 women, and eight children (205 Poles and 22 Jews). However, not all execution sites from September 1939 were examined. Historian Szymon Datner estimated that the death toll could have reached 300. Meanwhile, according to the Polish Red Cross, approximately 500 residents of Częstochowa were murdered on Bloody Monday.

On 3 September, German forces occupied the undefended town of Złoczew. That very night, SS troops from the 1st SS Panzer Division Leibstandarte SS Adolf Hitler, together with soldiers of the 95th Infantry Regiment of the 17th Infantry Division, suddenly began setting fire to houses and murdering civilians. The Germans opened fire on every civilian they encountered, including those fleeing from burning buildings. Both men and women, along with children, were massacred. Witness accounts include reports of victims being thrown into burning buildings and a small child being killed with a rifle butt. Approximately 200 Poles and Jews were killed in the massacre. The town was 80% destroyed by fire.

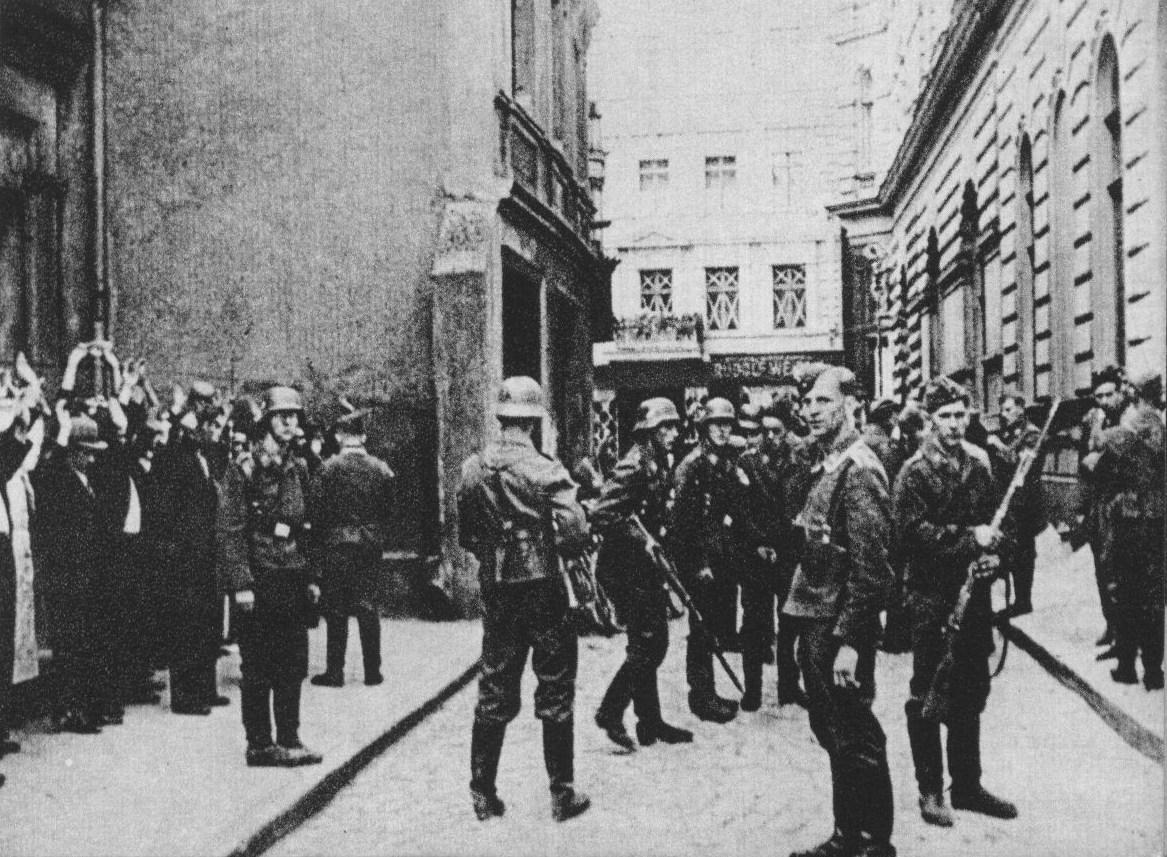
Łapanka at Parkowa Street in Bydgoszcz

On 5 September 1939, German troops of the 50th Infantry Division entered Bydgoszcz. There were no regular Polish forces left in the city, but the local Civil Guard put up resistance. Its members laid down their arms only after receiving assurances from General Eccard Freiherr von Gablenz that they would be treated as prisoners of war. In reality, they were handed over to the Einsatzgruppe IV officers. Many prisoners, including the two leaders of the Civil Guard – Konrad Fiedler and Marian Miczuga – were executed. Some prisoners were tortured to death with metal rods. Despite the Civil Guard's surrender, the occupiers believed a "Polish uprising" was still ongoing in Bydgoszcz. Chaotic gunfights erupted throughout the city. In response, Wehrmacht soldiers, along with Einsatzgruppe IV officers, conducted random arrests and executions. According to German estimates, between 5 and 8 September, 200 to 400 civilians were executed in Bydgoszcz. Several thousand men were temporarily arrested.

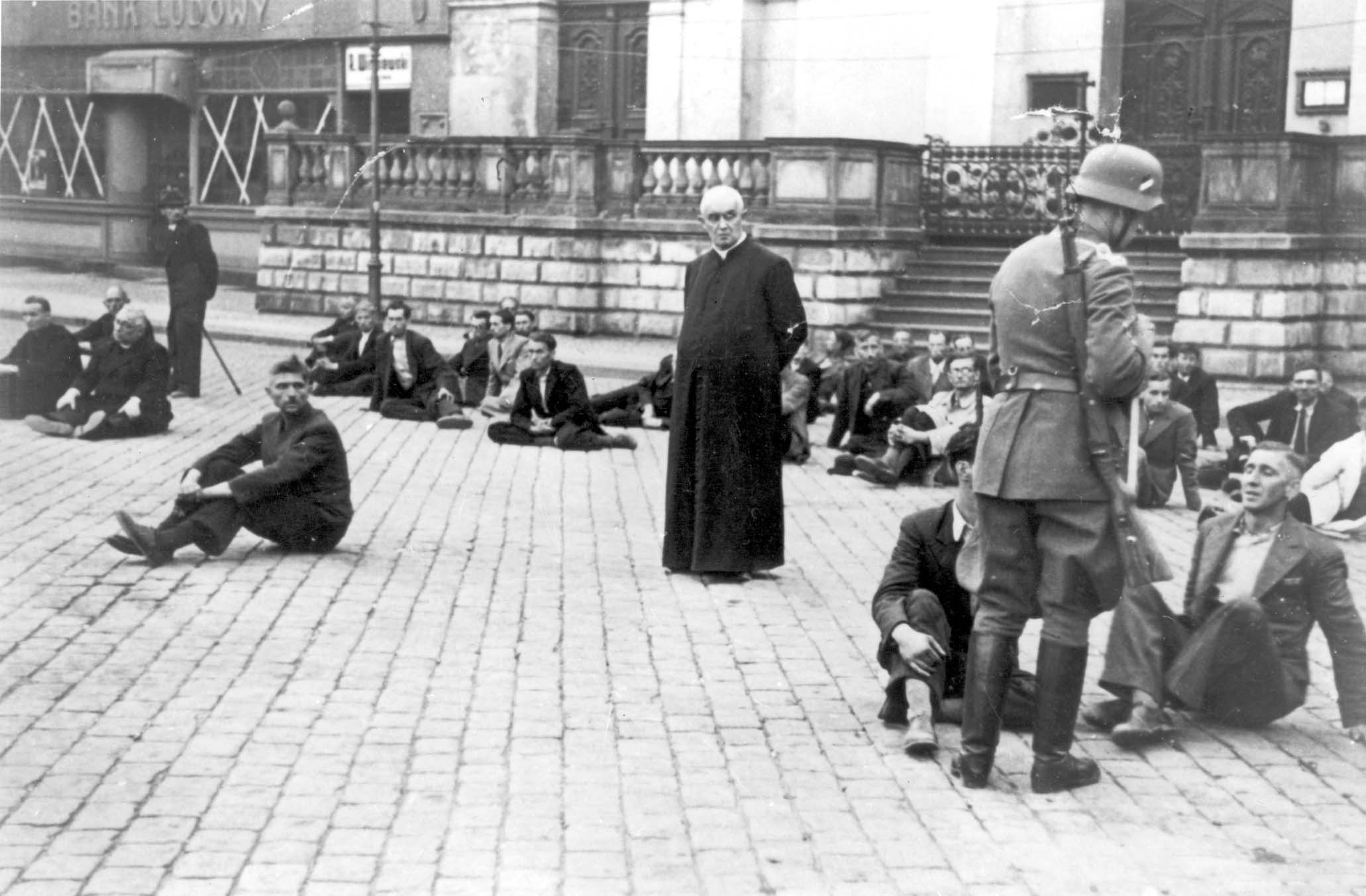
Polish hostages on Bydgoszcz's Old Market Square

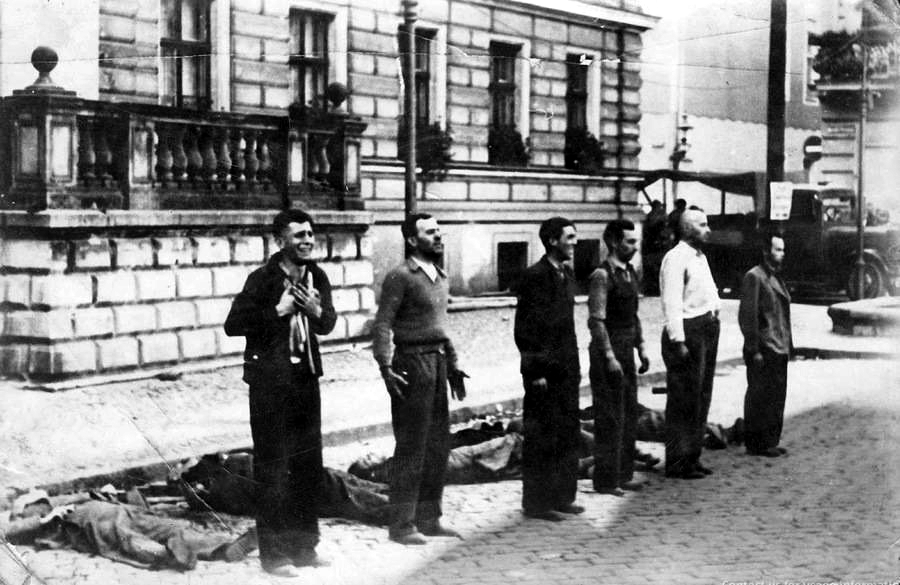
Public execution of hostages on Bydgoszcz's Old Market Square

On 8 September, General Major Walter Braemer was appointed military commander of Bydgoszcz. Under the orders of the 4th Army command and with the active support of Einsatzkommando 1/IV SS-Sturmbannführer Helmut Bischoff, he initiated a large-scale "cleansing action" (Säuberungsaktion) in the city. German soldiers, SS men, and policemen surrounded Polish neighborhoods in a tight cordon, systematically searching house by house. If weapons were found (which could include commemorative sabers, double-barreled shotguns, bayonets, or even police clubs), male residents were executed on the spot. The remaining "suspects" were sent to a makeshift internment camp set up at the 15th Infantry Regiment barracks. The reprisals particularly affected the working-class district of Szwederowo. (Note: In the combat diary of the 580th rear area of the army, the following entry was made under the date 10 September: "In the most infamous district inhabited by the commies, about 120 people were shot, and another 900 were arrested" (Böhler (2009, p. 225)).) On 9 September, 20 people were executed in a public execution at Bydgoszcz's Old Market Square. When a German soldier was shot on the night of 9–10 September, Braemer ordered the public execution of another 20 hostages the following day. Between 8 and 11 September, approximately 370 Poles were killed in Bydgoszcz. On 12 September, under an agreement between Braemer and Einsatzgruppe IV commander SS-Brigadeführer Lothar Beutel, 120 to 150 arrested Poles were executed in the forests near Bydgoszcz.

On 8 September, the 337th Infantry Regiment of the 208th Infantry Division entered Inowrocław. That same day, with the help of local Volksdeutsche, soldiers rounded up 4,000 to 5,000 residents and gathered them in the city's market square. Women, children, and the elderly were quickly released to their homes, but around 1,000 men were detained in local barracks. Most were released the following day, while 200 were kept as hostages. Additionally, in retaliation for the resistance put up by Polish rear guards as German troops entered the city, approximately 20 residents of Inowrocław were executed in the first days of September.

On 10 September, in apparent retaliation for the deaths of two German soldiers, about 40 people were executed in Rawa Mazowiecka. The victims included Poles and Jews, residents of the town as well as refugees from other parts of Poland.

On 12 September, in response to the death of a German officer, allegedly shot by a member of the PZL Mielec sports club, Wehrmacht soldiers executed at least 25 Polish men on the courtyard of the PZL Mielec factory in Okęcie, near Warsaw, after dragging them from nearby homes.

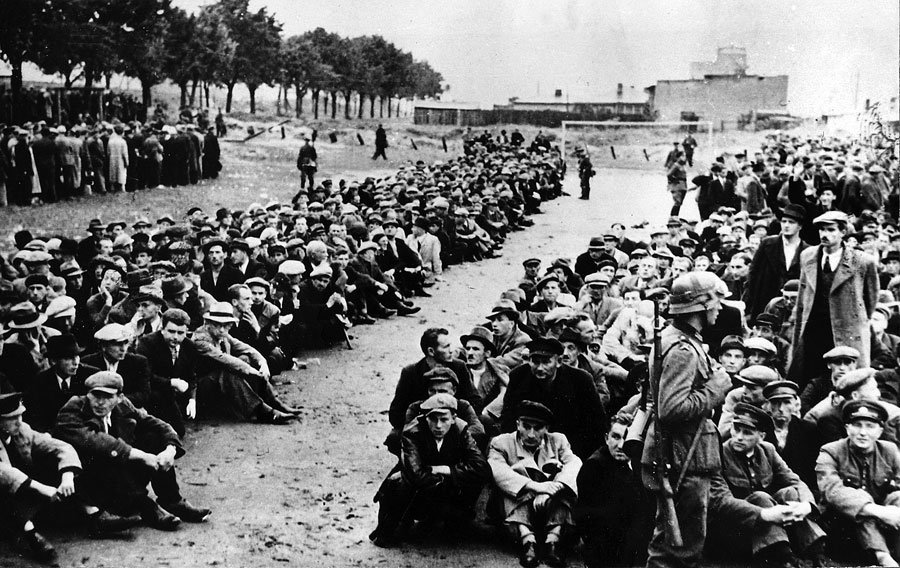
Internment of Poles after the fall of Gdynia

After the fall of Gdynia, the Germans carried out a large-scale "cleansing action" in the city between 13 and 15 September. The police and military arrested nearly 7,000 people. Prisoners were detained in churches, cinemas, and halls converted into makeshift jails. After three days of interrogations, 3,000 people were released. Interrogations continued in the following days. Ultimately, 2,250 people were preemptively arrested. Additionally, the Germans detained 130 individuals whose names were on proscriptive lists and another 120 as hostages.

=== German crimes in Upper Silesia ===
In Upper Silesia, resistance to the advancing German forces was put up by regular Polish Armed Forces units and volunteer self-defense formations. The former began their retreat eastward on the night of 2–3 September. Some of the volunteer units followed the army's retreat, while others attempted to conduct delaying actions. Ultimately, by 4 September, the Germans had taken control of the entire Polish part of Upper Silesia, including Cieszyn Silesia and the Dąbrowa Basin.

The resistance posed by Polish volunteer and paramilitary units fueled the "partisan delusions" among the German troops. On 3 September, the chief of staff of the General Quartermaster of the Oberkommando des Heeres, Colonel Eduard Wagner, noted: "Heavy battles with bands are taking place everywhere in Upper Silesia, and they can only be broken by draconian measures". To pacify the region, Wehrmacht units, two Einsatzgruppen operating in the area – EG I, EG II – and members of the Freikorps Ebbinghaus were deployed. However, the Wehrmacht believed these forces were still insufficient. Reichsführer-SS Heinrich Himmler used this to create a new operational group, the Einsatzgruppe zur besonderen Verwendung, on 3 September, with the task of "radically suppressing the smoldering Polish uprising on the occupied territories of Upper Silesia by all available means". Along with this, additional battalions of the Ordnungspolizei were sent to Upper Silesia. Himmler simultaneously ordered that "Polish insurgents caught in the act or armed should be shot on the spot".

The mass reprisals targeted civilian defenders of Upper Silesia and those whose names appeared on German proscription lists. According to the reports of the Einsatzgruppen, particular focus was placed on veterans of the Silesian Uprisings and former plebiscite activists.

On 4 September, German troops entered Katowice. Wehrmacht soldiers, EG I officers, and members of the Freikorps Ebbinghaus carried out numerous mass and individual executions in the city. These took place, among other locations, on Zamkowa, Jagiellońska, and Barbary streets, in Kościuszko Park, on Freedom Square, at the sports field, at the local shooting range, in the courtyard of the Katowice prison, in Załęże, in Zarzecze forest, and in Panewniki Forest. It is estimated that in September 1939, as many as 750 people were murdered in Katowice.

Executions also took place in many other towns in Upper Silesia and the Dąbrowa Basin, including Łaziska Dolne, Łaziska Górne, and Łaziska Średnie (2–3 and 6 September, about 70 victims), in Tychy and surrounding towns (3–4 and 6 September, over 60 victims), in Jankowice (3 September, 13 victims), near Orzesze (3–4 September, over 40 victims), in Świętochłowice (3–4 September, 10 victims), in Pszczyna (4 September, 13 scouts), in Siewierz (4 September, 10 victims), in Mikołów (5, 7, and 17 September, at least 16 victims), in Tarnowskie Góry and nearby areas (4, 6, 11, and 17 September, several victims), in Siemianowice Śląskie (8 September, 6 victims), in Piekary Śląskie (17 September, 4 victims), in Tucznawa (14 scouts), and in Chorzów. In Sosnowiec, a public execution was carried out in front of the town hall on 4 September, where 10 hostages were shot.

It is likely that in September 1939, the Germans murdered approximately 1,400 people in Upper Silesia.

== Persecution and atrocities against Jews ==
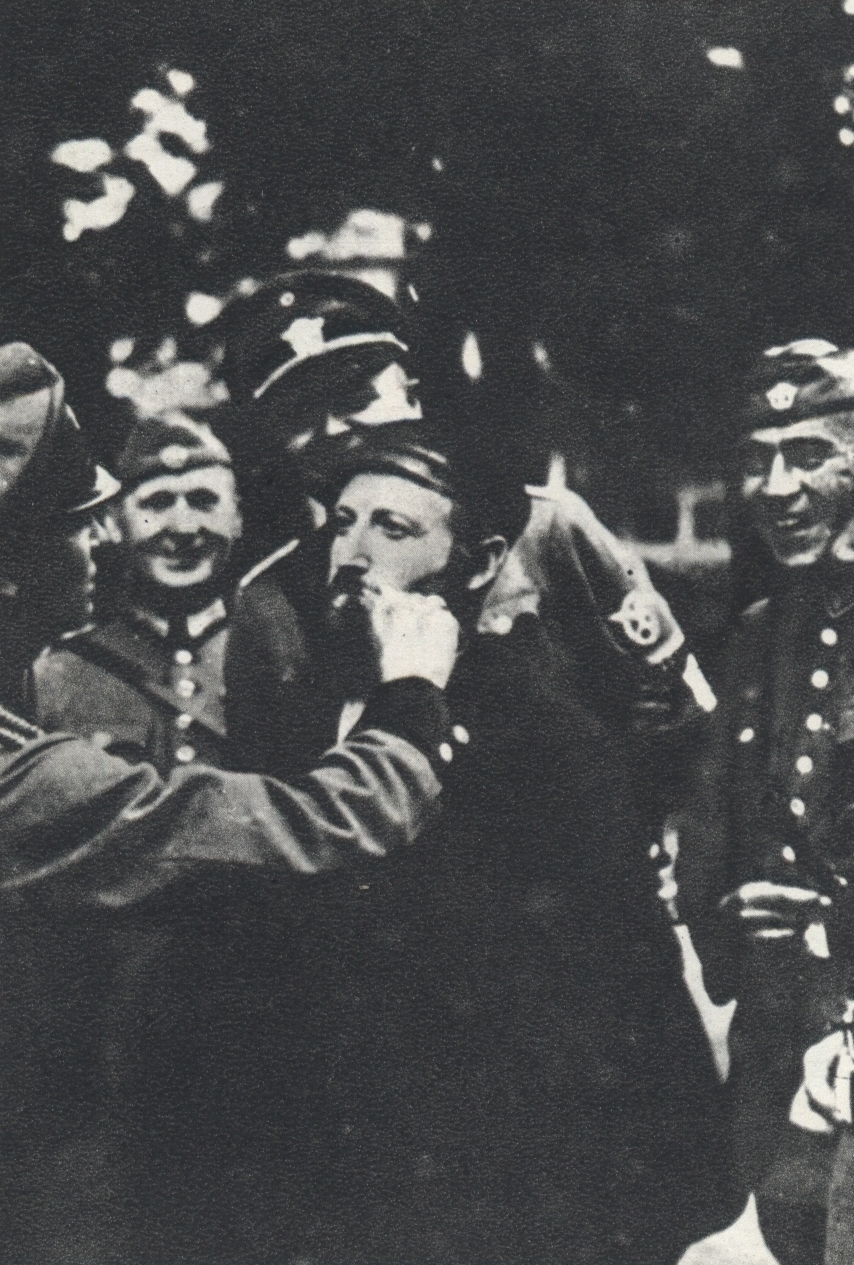
Jewish man tortured by German policemen. Warsaw, first days of the occupation

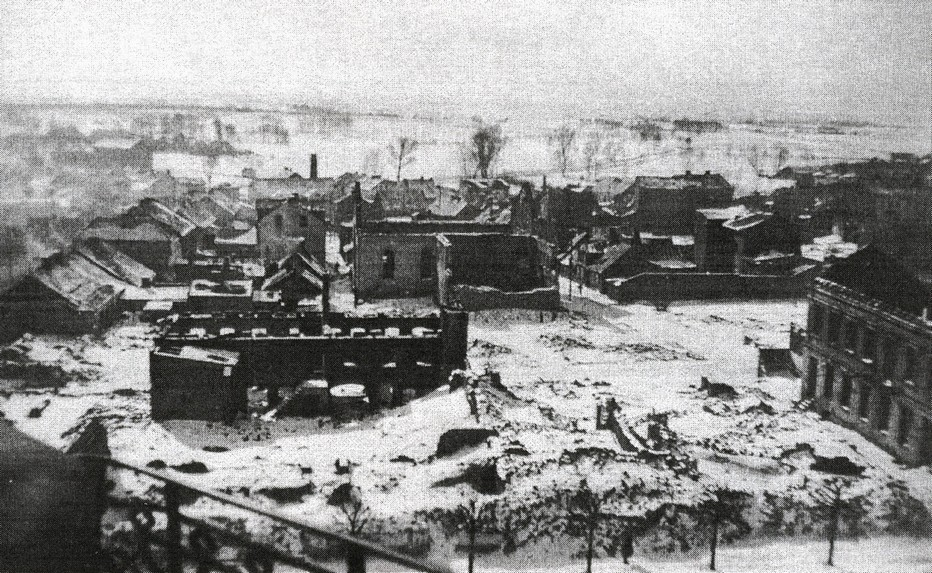
Burned synagogue in Mława

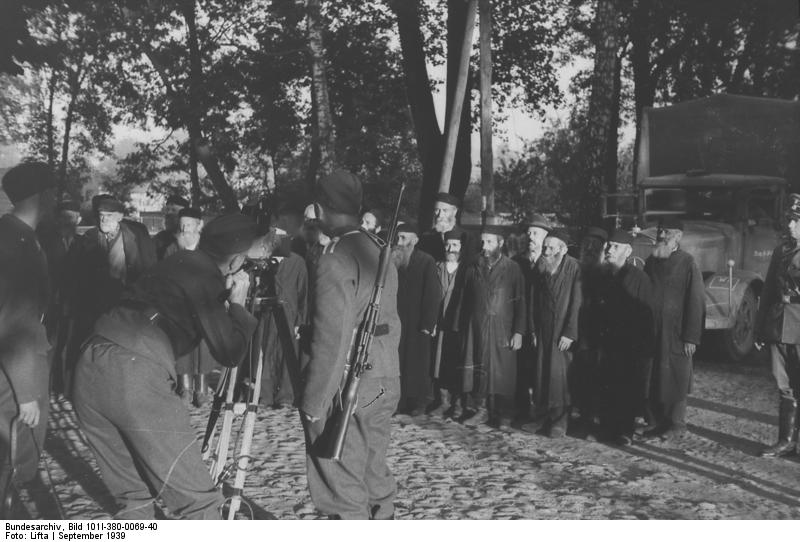
Group of arrested Jews. In the foreground, SS men and policemen filming them

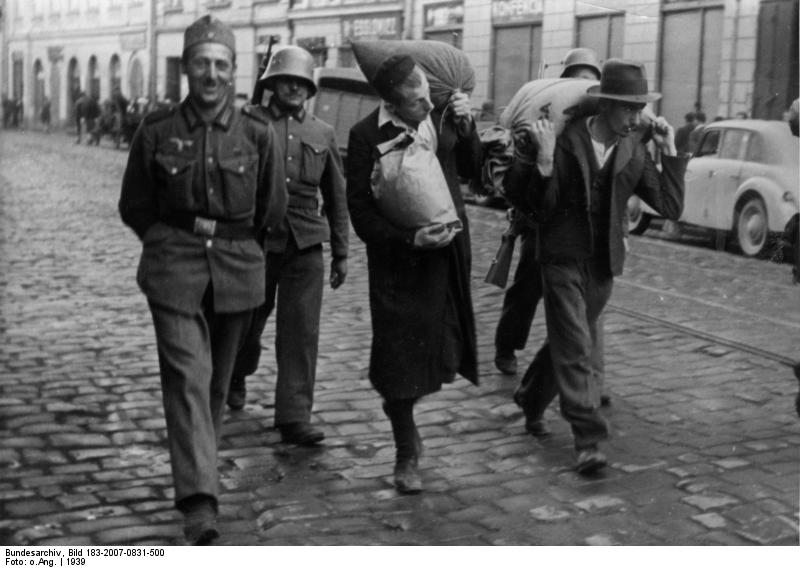
Upper Silesia. Two Jews arrested under suspicion of speculation

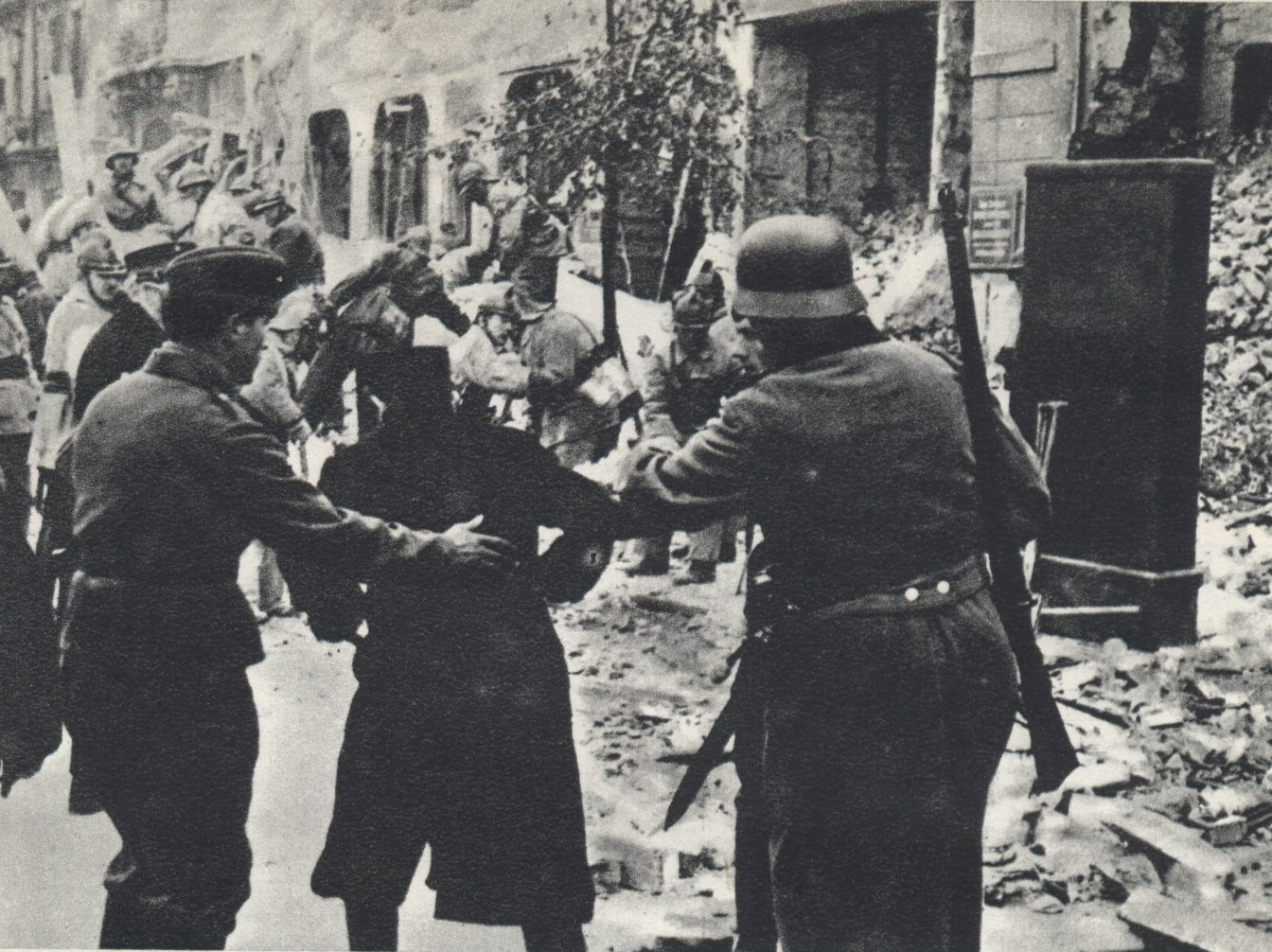
Warsaw Jews forced to work clearing rubble from the streets

The entry of German troops into Poland was accompanied by a wave of violence against Jews. German soldiers had been indoctrinated for years in an antisemitic spirit, and their hostility towards Jews was further heightened by their encounter with the "Jews from the East" (Ostjuden) residing in Poland. These Jews differed in dress and customs from German Jews, which made them easily recognizable targets in the eyes of soldiers, policemen, and SS men. Their distinctiveness seemed to confirm the antisemitic stereotypes spread by Der Stürmer and other Nazi propaganda tools. Additionally, there was a widespread belief in the German army that crimes against Jews would not be punished.

As a result, in dozens of Polish towns, there were "swift pogroms". During these acts of violence, Wehrmacht soldiers and other German formations tortured, terrorized, and humiliated Jews, as well as destroyed or looted their property. In many towns, including Aleksandrów Łódzki, Cieszyn, Bielsko-Biała, Gąbin, Gostyń, Koło, Mława, Piotrków Trybunalski, Przasnysz, Sosnowiec, Wągrowiec, and Włocławek, synagogues were burned or blown up. In some cases, Jewish houses of worship were desecrated, being turned into stables (Konin, Serock) or soldier latrines (Radomsko). A particularly common "entertainment" was setting fire to or cutting off the beards of orthodox Jewish men, as well as forcing Jews to perform "gymnastic exercises". Another widespread practice was forcing Jews to do heavy, often senseless and degrading labor. During these "swift pogroms", there were rapes of Jewish women.

In some cases, these pogroms and acts of violence resulted in massacres. On 2 or 3 September in Wieruszów, between 17 and 24 Jews were publicly executed, and many others were beaten and interned. (Note: According to Polish sources, two massacres took place in Wieruszów. On Bloody Saturday, 2 September, 41 residents (both Poles and Jews) were allegedly murdered. The following day, a newly arrived SS unit reportedly executed 17 Jews "along with their families", who were said to have been respected within the local community (Zbrodnie Wehrmachtu w Wielkopolsce (1986, pp. 56–57); Datner (1967, pp. 183, 203)). However, according to Böhler (2009, p. 206), there may have been a mistake in this account, at least regarding the date of the first massacre.) On 4 September in Żarki, around 90 Jews were shot, along with 12 Poles. On the night of 5–6 September, Wehrmacht soldiers and SS-Verfügungstruppe forced about 50 Jews into a synagogue in Krasnosielc, where they were executed. On 9 September in Lipsko, six Jews, including the local rabbi, were publicly executed in the town square. On the same evening (or the previous day), soldiers of the 29th Infantry Division carried out a pogrom in the town, during which they murdered between 60 and 80 Jews. Most of the victims perished in the burned synagogue. On 9 September in Wyszków, at least 65 Jews were killed. On 12 September in Końskie, several dozen Jews were brought to the town square and forced to dig graves for fallen German soldiers. The victims were brutally beaten. When, in the ensuing chaos, a group of Jews attempted to flee, a German officer passing by opened fire with an automatic weapon. Other soldiers also opened fire. As a result of the massacre, 22 people were killed. In Błonie, on the night of 18–19 September, on the orders of the regimental chief bandmaster of the SS Division Leibstandarte, around 50 people, mostly or exclusively Jews, were executed.

Some of the crimes against Jews were the result of direct orders from Nazi authorities. The Nazi leadership viewed with concern the fact that the occupation of western and central Poland would bring nearly 2 million additional Jews under German rule. As early as the second week of September, SS-Gruppenführer Reinhard Heydrich proposed deporting Polish Jews to territories that, according to the Molotov-Ribbentrop Pact, were to come under Soviet occupation. This plan was likely approved by the Wehrmacht's high command, as evidenced by a directive from 12 September 1939, issued by Colonel Eduard Wagner to the command of Army Group South, ordering the expulsion of all Jews from the Polish part of Upper Silesia "beyond the San river". At the same time, in an effort to accelerate the mass exodus of Jews into the Soviet-occupied zone, the Germans initiated brutal pogroms and deportations. Einsatzgruppen played a key role in these operations, particularly Einsatzgruppe zur besonderen Verwendung, led by SS-Obergruppenführer Udo von Woyrsch, and Einsatzgruppe I, commanded by SS-Brigadeführer Bruno Streckenbach.

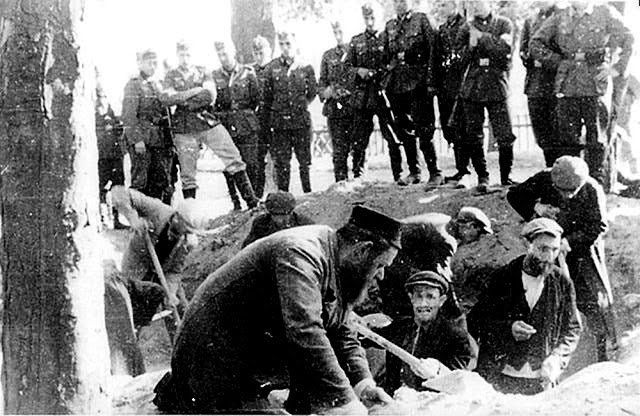
Jews from Końskie digging graves in the town square just before the massacre on 12 September 1939

On 7 September, Einsatzgruppe zur besonderen Verwendung carried out a massacre in Będzin, where its members burned down the synagogue and murdered hundreds of Jews. The same unit executed about 50 Jews in Trzebinia, 98 Jews near Sławków, and another 32 near Wieliczka. In Kraków, in retaliation for an alleged attack on Wehrmacht soldiers, Einsatzgruppe I personnel executed 10 Jews on 12 September. During this period, one of the "signature" actions of the Einsatzgruppen, especially in southern Poland, became the burning of synagogues. For instance, on 8 September, Einsatzgruppe zur besonderen Verwendung set fire to the Great Synagogue in Katowice. The scale of these burnings became so extensive that Heinrich Himmler was forced to issue an order on 9 September to spare at least the synagogues in Kraków, Łódź, and Warsaw.

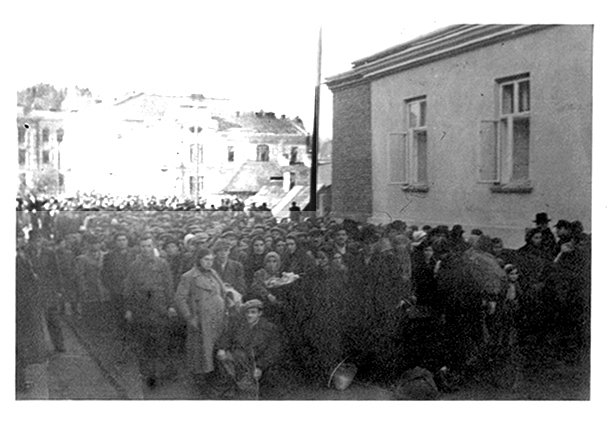
Expulsion of Jews from Sanok

After reaching the San river, Einsatzgruppe zur besonderen Verwendung and Einsatzgruppe I systematically murdered Jews to trigger mass escapes into Soviet-occupied territories. Einsatzkommando 3/I, part of Einsatzgruppe I, expelled about 18,000 Jews beyond the San between Sandomierz and Jarosław. In Dynów, another unit, Einsatzkommando 1/I, executed at least 200 people. Around 150 victims were shot outside the town, while 50 others were burned alive in the synagogue. A few days later, the remaining Jews of Dynów were forced to wade across the San into the Soviet zone. The largest massacre occurred in Przemyśl, where between 16 and 19 September 1939, personnel from Einsatzgruppe zur besonderen Verwendung and Einsatzgruppe I murdered at least between 500 and 600 Jews.

Jewish expulsions beyond the German-Soviet demarcation line were also conducted in northern Masovia and Suwałki, areas intended for incorporation into East Prussia. Einsatzgruppe V expelled large numbers of Jews from towns such as Mława, Przasnysz, Ostrołęka, Pułtusk, and Nasielsk.

The exact number of Jews murdered by the Germans in September 1939 remains unknown, but estimates suggest the toll reached the thousands.

On 21 September, before military operations in Poland had even concluded, a conference was held in Berlin under the leadership of SS-Gruppenführer Reinhard Heydrich. Attended by the heads of key departments within the Reich Main Security Office and Einsatzgruppen commanders, the meeting established plans to deport all Jews from territories intended for incorporation into the Reich to central Poland. These mass deportations were to be preceded by the removal of Jewish populations from rural areas and their concentration in larger urban centers. Even in other occupied territories, Jews were to be forcibly resettled into larger towns, particularly those near railway lines. Additionally, decisions were made to conduct a census of the Jewish population and establish Judenräte (Jewish councils).

== Air raids on civilian targets ==
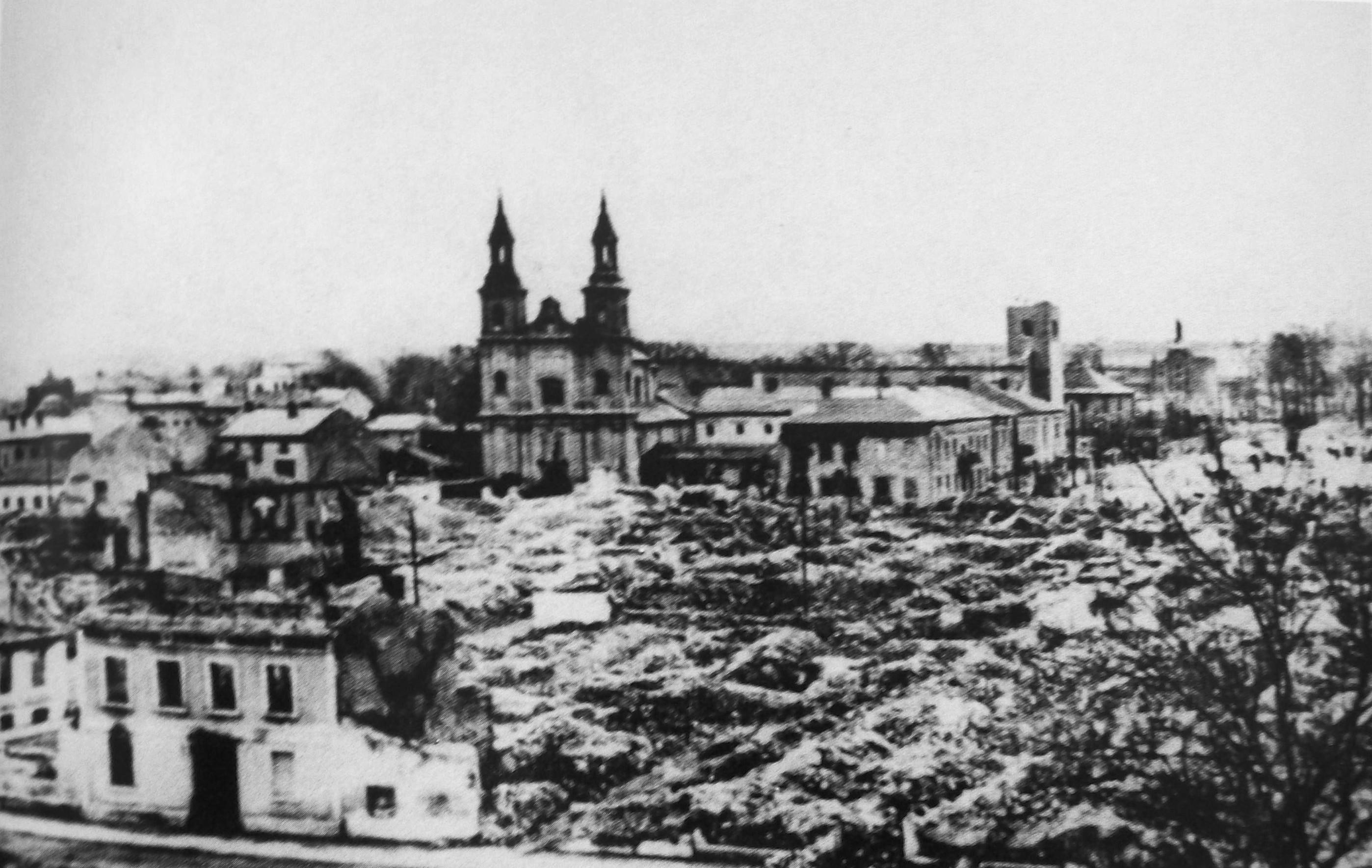
Destruction caused by air raids on Wieluń

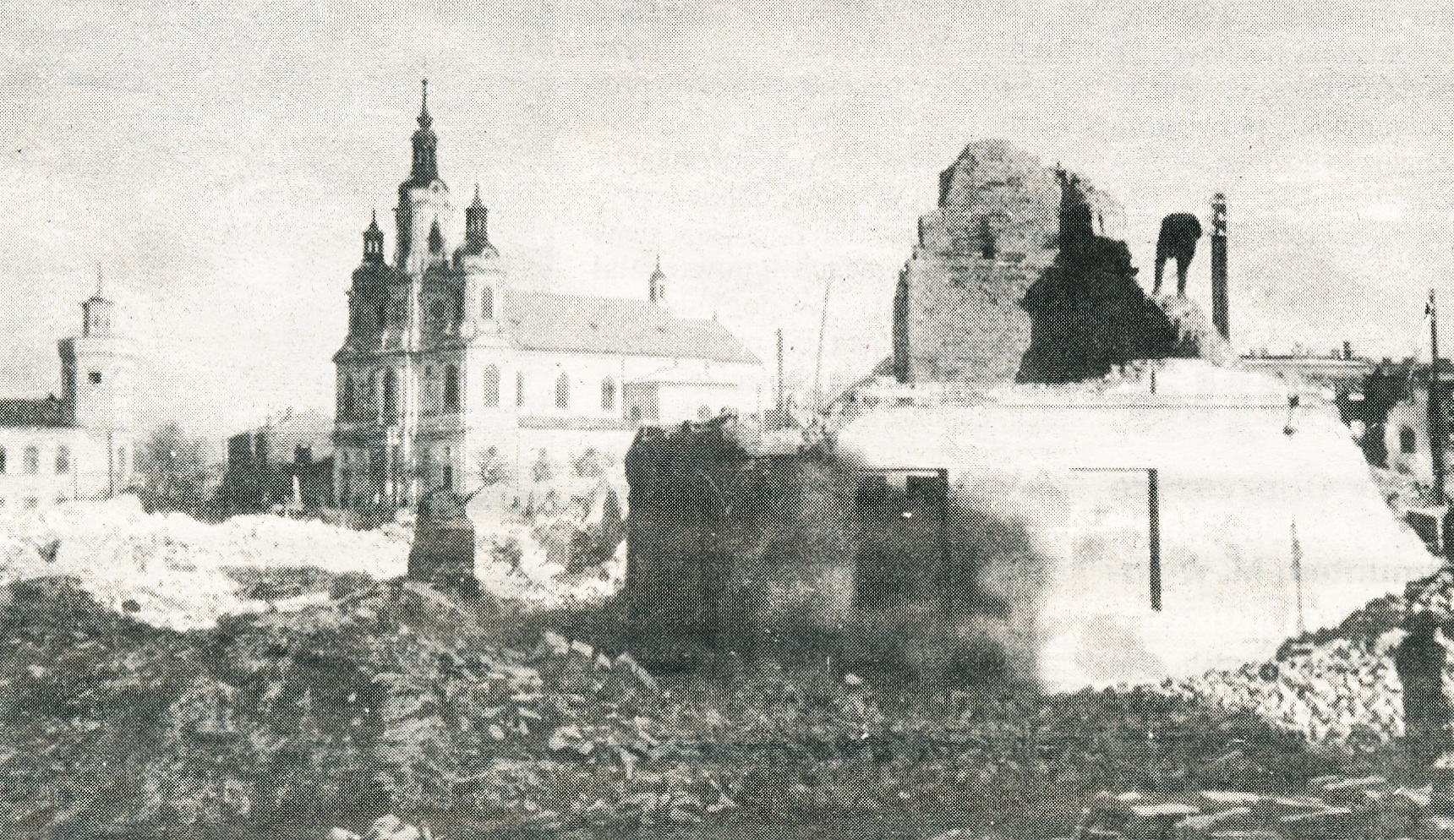
Radomsko: destruction caused by German air raids

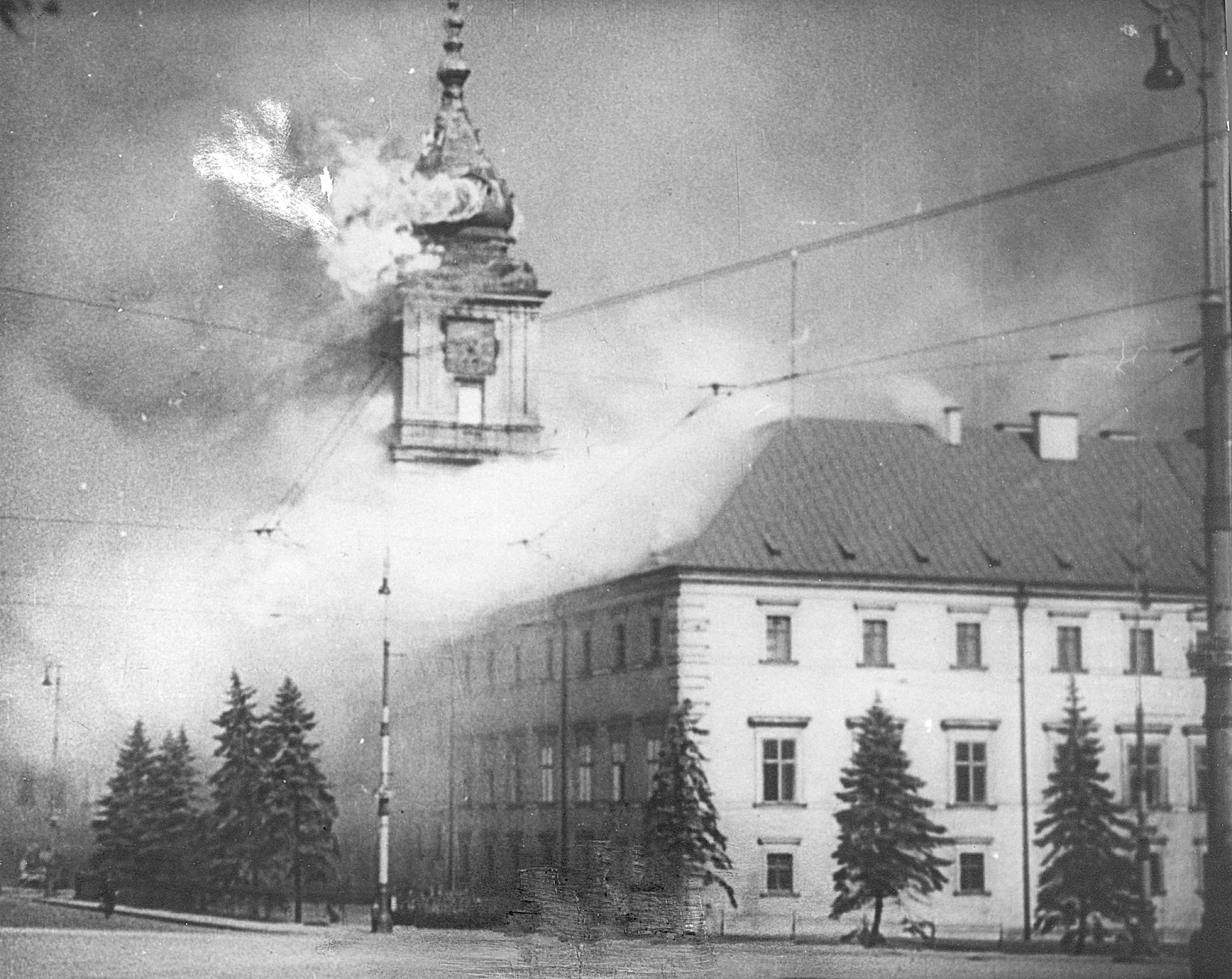
Burning Royal Castle in Warsaw, 17 September 1939

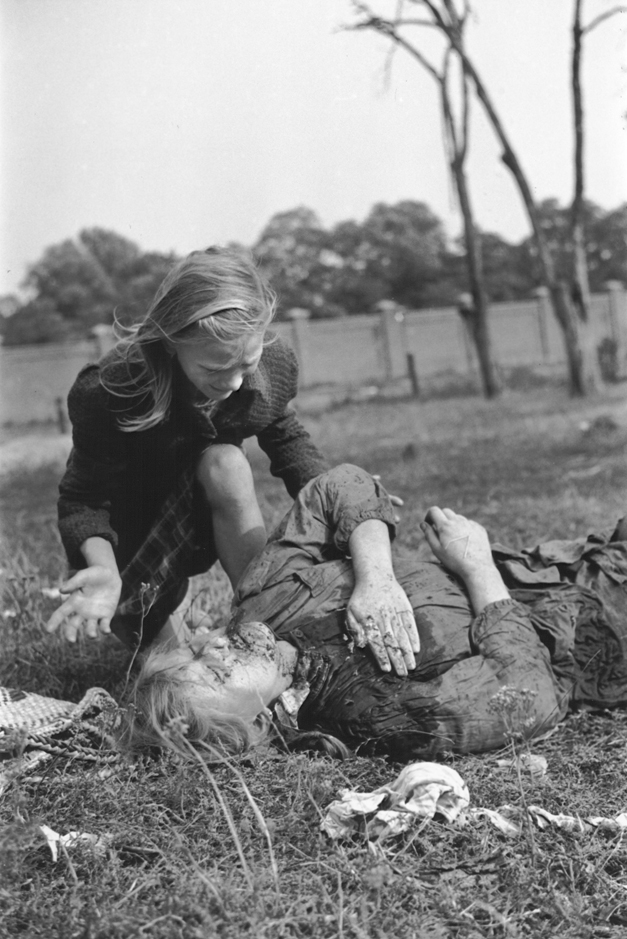
Kazimiera Kostewicz grieving over the body of her older sister Anna, killed by machine-gun fire from a German aircraft. Warsaw, 13 September 1939

During the September Campaign, the German armed forces used aviation on a massive scale against the civilian population for the first time. According to calculations by Szymon Datner, in September 1939, the Luftwaffe bombed a total of 158 undefended towns and settlements in Poland. However, these estimates are incomplete, partly because they include only those localities that remained within Poland's borders after 1945.

On 1 September 1939, starting in the early morning hours, Luftflotte 4 carried out a series of air raids on Wieluń. At that time, no Polish military units were stationed in the town, nor did it have any air defenses. Luftwaffe bombs destroyed 70–75% of the town. Under the rubble of the bombed hospital, 26 patients and six staff members were killed. According to Polish sources, the total number of victims may have reached as many as 1,200, although post-war investigations were able to determine the names of only 127 of the dead.

Among the towns that suffered particularly heavy destruction due to German air raids in the following days was Sulejów. Despite being undefended and having no Polish military presence, it was bombed multiple times by the Luftwaffe between 4 and 6 September. On 6 September, German artillery also joined the assault. As a result, 80% of Sulejów was destroyed, and the number of fatalities ranged from 600 to 1,500.

In Żarki, which was bombed on the second day of the war, between 70 and 150 people were killed. In Uniejów, bombed on 4 September, around 70 people died, including many refugees from Ostrów County. On 13 September, Frampol was the target of a concentrated air raid. The town was nearly 90% destroyed, though human casualties were relatively low. Other towns where German air raids caused the destruction of over 50% of buildings included Kurów and Garwolin.

Additionally, German aviators repeatedly attacked columns of refugees on the roads and evacuation trains carrying civilians – even when no Polish soldiers were nearby. On 4 September, an informational communiqué from the Poznań Army stated:

German aviators are strafing the columns of refugees moving eastward along the highways with onboard guns. The bursts were fired at good visibility from an altitude of 100–200 meters. [...] The assumption that these could be military columns was absolutely excluded. The columns of refugees consisted mainly of elderly people, women, and children; among them, many were killed or wounded.

Attacks on refugee columns were recorded in areas such as Gniezno and on the Warsaw–Siedlce road. On the latter, around 600 people were said to have died. On 2 September, an evacuation train from Krotoszyn was bombed at the Koło railway station, killing between 200 and 300 civilians. Attacks on evacuation trains also took place around Słupca and in Łuków (4 September). There were even instances where German pilots targeted individual people; one such case involved a pilot killing an 8-year-old boy herding cows. The most symbolic act of Luftwaffe cruelty was the death of 14-year-old Anna Kostewicz, who was killed by machine-gun fire while digging potatoes on the outskirts of Warsaw, a scene captured by American photojournalist Julien Bryan.

From the first day of the war, Warsaw became a target for German air raids. German aviators did not limit their attacks to military targets but also bombed and strafed civilian objects, including hospitals, churches, cultural institutions, and historic buildings. Witnesses recalled that publicizing the addresses of hospitals or marking them with the Red Cross signs not only failed to prevent attacks but actually intensified artillery fire and aerial bombings. German aviators not only bombed the city but also strafed civilians, targeting firemen putting out fires, refugees on the main roads, and women digging potatoes in the fields. The fact that air raids on Warsaw caused more damage in the city center than in the suburban districts, which were closer to the front line, suggests the terroristic nature of the attacks. On 10 September, the daily order of the Luftwaffe General Staff directly instructed to "cause extensive destruction in the densely populated areas of the city", justifying it with alleged Polish war crimes against German soldiers.

The heaviest raid on Warsaw took place on 25 September. This day went down in the history of the city as Lany Poniedziałek (Wet Monday) or Czarny Poniedziałek (Black Monday). From early morning until dusk, the city was bombed with unprecedented intensity. It was the heaviest raid in the history of wars up until that point and the largest Luftwaffe attack on a single city until the bombing of Stalingrad in 1942. Among the buildings set on fire were the Hospital of the Holy Spirit and the main building of the Children's Hospital. It is estimated that between 5,000 and 10,000 people were killed that day. In total, during the siege of Warsaw, the number of civilian casualties caused by German air raids and artillery fire may have reached 25,000 killed and up to 50,000 wounded.

According to Jochen Böhler, the air raids on civilian targets carried out by the Luftwaffe in Poland in September 1939 aimed to terrorize the population and also served as a practical test of the capabilities of modern air forces.

== Rapes and looting ==
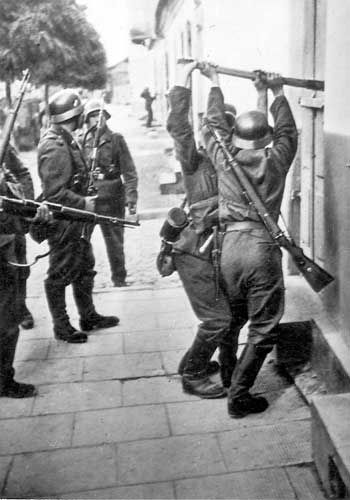
German soldiers breaking into a house in western Poland

Despite strict orders to maintain discipline, there were significant problems with discipline within the ranks of the Wehrmacht units fighting in Poland. This was reflected in numerous instances of unlawful requisitions and open looting. German soldiers looted items such as alcohol, cigarettes, jewelry, furniture, and luxury goods. Such incidents were recorded in towns including Kalisz, Sanok, Kraków, and Kielce. In Łódź, the 8th Army command was forced to introduce, on 16 September, a ban on entry to the city for soldiers who were neither stationed there nor had written permission or orders from their superiors. In Łomża, Red Army officers, who had taken the city from the Germans, pointed out to German commanders the "very bad memories" left by Wehrmacht soldiers who had looted shops.

After the capitulation and the entry of German troops into Warsaw, a wave of looting broke out in the city. The military commander of Warsaw, General Conrad von Cochenhausen, was forced to issue a letter on 6 October to the commanders of the 18th and 19th Infantry Divisions, which included the following statements:

Prohibited requisitions – read: looting – have taken on proportions in Warsaw that are a disgrace to the army and have greatly negatively impacted discipline within its ranks. There were instances where soldiers rummaging through wine cellars shot at each other […] Excesses by drunken officers are a daily occurrence.

Preserved German military documents indicate that the entry of German forces into Poland was accompanied by cases of rape of Polish and Jewish women. Due to the limited source base, however, the scale of this phenomenon remains difficult to estimate. SS-Gruppenführer Reinhard Heydrich noted with satisfaction:

Compared to the crimes, looting, and excesses of the Wehrmacht, SS and police certainly do not fare the worst.

The scale of discipline problems is evident from the fact that this issue remained the subject of orders issued by the Commander-in-Chief of the Army, General Walther von Brauchitsch, until the end of 1939. The actions taken by the German command to curb looting and rapes were not motivated by sympathy for the civilian population but rather by concerns about lowering discipline and tarnishing the image of the Wehrmacht.

== Summary ==
According to incomplete estimates, the number of victims of German crimes during the September Campaign includes:

- Over 3,000 Polish Armed Forces soldiers killed away from active combat zones.
- Between 10,000 and several tens of thousands of civilians killed as a result of air raids and artillery shelling.
- 16,336 civilians murdered in 714 executions carried out between 1 September and 25 October 1939, during the period of military administration in the occupied Polish territories. Among these victims, 12,137 (nearly 75%) were executed in September 1939. (Note: According to other sources, between 1 September and 25 October 1939, the Germans carried out over 760 executions and massacres in Poland, in which more than 20,100 people were murdered. Wehrmacht units were said to be responsible for 310 of these crimes (Cieplewicz (1979, pp. 843–844)).) The majority of those executed were men (96%), though a certain number of women and children were also among the victims.

It is impossible to determine how many executions were carried out by the Wehrmacht versus police or paramilitary formations. However, according to Jochen Böhler: "It can be assumed that at least during the German invasion of Poland, the Wehrmacht was responsible for nearly as many executions as the police operational groups or SS formations".

The same historian believes that the scale of violence used by the German army against Polish civilians and prisoners of war justifies the thesis that, as early as September 1939, the early signs of total war emerged in Poland, which Nazi Germany unleashed two years later on a full scale with the attack on the Soviet Union.

On 4 October, Adolf Hitler announced a general amnesty for all Wehrmacht soldiers, SS officers, Ordnungspolizei members, and Selbstschutz members who had committed "acts of fury caused by the atrocities committed by the Poles" between 1 September and 4 October 1939 in occupied Poland. This document was countersigned by the head of the Oberkommando der Wehrmacht, General Wilhelm Keitel, and the Secretary of State in the Reich Ministry of Justice, Roland Freisler. Amendments suggested by the highest military commanders concerned the exclusion of applying the amnesty to those responsible for crimes and offenses caused by a lack of military discipline (rape, looting, extortion, etc.).

Böhler points out that the harsh punishments imposed on German soldiers proven to have committed looting, rapes, or desertion during the fighting in Poland contrast with the impunity enjoyed by the perpetrators of massacres against civilians. In his view:

As long as the uncontrolled excesses of German soldiers and SS men did not harm the established military mission, any intervention was considered undesirable. One could even go further and argue that at the beginning of the war, German military commanders viewed their soldiers' misdeeds as a means of achieving the rapid "pacification" of the country. Acts of terror were meant to break the already existing resistance of the civilian population or to deter Poles from engaging in hostile activity in the future. Thus, mass shootings [...] and Luftwaffe bombings were merely two sides of the same coin.

After the war, no former soldier or officer of the Wehrmacht responsible for crimes committed during the period of military administration in occupied Poland was prosecuted in the Federal Republic of Germany.

== In culture ==
The German invasion of Poland in September 1939 and the accompanying crimes are the focus of the 2009 German documentary film Der Überfall. Deutschlands Krieg gegen Polen (directed by Knut Weinrich).

== Bibliography ==
- Böhler, Jochen; Mallmann, Klaus-Michael; Matthäus, Jürgen (2009). Einsatzgruppen w Polsce [Einsatzgruppen in Poland] (in Polish). Warsaw: Bellona. ISBN 978-83-11-11588-0.
- Böhler, Jochen (2011). Najazd 1939. Niemcy przeciw Polsce [Invasion 1939: Germany Against Poland] (in Polish). Kraków: Znak. ISBN 978-83-240-1808-6.
- Böhler, Jochen (2009). Zbrodnie Wehrmachtu w Polsce [Wehrmacht Crimes in Poland] (in Polish). Kraków: Znak. ISBN 978-83-240-1225-1.
- Cieplewicz, Mieczysław (1979). Wojna obronna Polski 1939 [Poland's Defensive War of 1939] (in Polish). Warsaw: MON. ISBN 83-11-06314-1.
- Datner, Szymon (1967). 55 dni Wehrmachtu w Polsce. Zbrodnie dokonane na polskiej ludności cywilnej w okresie 1.IX – 25.X. 1939 r. [55 Days of the Wehrmacht in Poland: Crimes Committed Against the Polish Civilian Population from September 1 to October 25, 1939] (in Polish). Warsaw: MON.
- Datner, Szymon (1961). Zbrodnie Wehrmachtu na jeńcach wojennych w II wojnie światowej [Wehrmacht Crimes Against Prisoners of War in World War II] (in Polish). Warsaw: MON.
- Fajkowski, Józef; Religa, Jan (1981). Zbrodnie hitlerowskie na wsi polskiej 1939–1945 [Nazi Crimes in the Polish Countryside 1939–1945] (in Polish). Warsaw: Książka i Wiedza.
- Kaliński, Dariusz (2022). Twierdza Warszawa. Pierwsza wielka bitwa miejska II wojny światowej [Fortress Warsaw: The First Major Urban Battle of World War II] (in Polish). Kraków: Znak Horyzont. ISBN 978-83-240-8785-3.
- Rutowska, Maria; Ziółkowska, Anna, eds. (2019). Specjalna księga gończa dla Polski. Sonderfahndungsbuch Polen [Special Prosecution Book – Poland. Sonderfahndungsbuch Polen] (in Polish). Poznań: Instytut Zachodni. ISBN 978-83-66412-24-8.
- Wardzyńska, Maria (2009). Był rok 1939. Operacja niemieckiej policji bezpieczeństwa w Polsce. Intelligenzaktion [It Was 1939: The Operation of the German Security Police in Poland. Intelligenzaktion] (in Polish). Warsaw: Instytut Pamięci Narodowej. ISBN 978-83-7629-063-8.
- Zbrodnie Wehrmachtu w Wielkopolsce w okresie zarządu wojskowego (1 września – 25 października 1939) [Wehrmacht Crimes in Greater Poland During the Military Administration (September 1 – October 25, 1939)] (in Polish). Kalisz: Instytut Pamięci Narodowej. 1986.
