= Szarów =

Szarów may refer to the following places in Poland:

- Szarów, Lesser Poland Voivodeship
- Szarów, Łódź Voivodeship
