= Karnice =

Karnice may refer to the following places in Poland:

- Karnice, Gmina Udanin, Środa County in Lower Silesian Voivodeship (south-west Poland)
- Karnice, Trzebnica County in Lower Silesian Voivodeship (south-west Poland)
- Karnice, Łódź Voivodeship (central Poland)
- Karnice, Masovian Voivodeship (east-central Poland)
- Karnice, Gryfice County in West Pomeranian Voivodeship (north-west Poland)
- Karnice, Łobez County in West Pomeranian Voivodeship (north-west Poland)
