= Praga (disambiguation) =

Praga is a district of Warsaw, Poland.

Praga may also refer to:

== Places ==
- Prague, Czech Republic, in some languages, including Galician, Italian, Latin, Portuguese, Polish, Romanian, Russian, and Spanish
- Praga, Łódź Voivodeship, a village in central Poland

== Companies ==
- Praga (company), a Prague-based engine, car and aircraft manufacturing company
- Praga Tools, manufacturer of machine tools in Telangana, India

== People ==
- Emilio Praga (1839–1875), Italian poet
- Marco Praga (1862–1929), Italian playwright

== Other uses ==
- A Praga, a 1980 Brazilian horror film
