= Golice =

Golice may refer to a number of settlements:

- Golice, Łódź Voivodeship (central Poland)
- Golice, Masovian Voivodeship (east-central Poland)
- Golice, Lubusz Voivodeship (west Poland)
- Golice, West Pomeranian Voivodeship (north-west Poland)
- Golice, Kamnik, a settlement in the Municipality of Kamnik, Slovenia
