= Zagorzyce =

Zagorzyce may refer to the following places:

- Zagorzyce, Kuyavian-Pomeranian Voivodeship (north-central Poland)
- Zagorzyce, Lesser Poland Voivodeship (south Poland)
- Zagorzyce, Subcarpathian Voivodeship (south-east Poland)
- Zagorzyce, Świętokrzyskie Voivodeship (south-central Poland)

Zagórzyce may refer to the following places:

- Zagórzyce, Lower Silesian Voivodeship (south-west Poland)
- Zagórzyce, Łódź Voivodeship (central Poland)
- Zagórzyce, Kazimierza County in Świętokrzyskie Voivodeship (south-central Poland)
- Zagórzyce, Pińczów County in Świętokrzyskie Voivodeship (south-central Poland)
- Zagórzyce, West Pomeranian Voivodeship (north-west Poland)
