= Małe =

Małe (Polish:"little") may refer to:

- Małe, Łódź Voivodeship, Poland
- Małe, Pomeranian Voivodeship, Poland

== See also ==
- Male (disambiguation)
