= Antonina, Poddębice County =

Antonina
- Village
- Location within Poland
- Coordinates: 51°51′21″N 18°51′4″E
- Country: Poland
- Voivodeship: Łódź
- County: Poddębice
- Gmina: Poddębice

Antonina [antɔˈnina] is a village in the administrative district of Gmina Poddębice, within Poddębice County, Łódź Voivodeship, in central Poland.
