= Feliksów, Poddębice County =

Feliksów
- Village
- Location within Poland
- Coordinates: 51°49′53″N 18°58′57″E
- Country: Poland
- Voivodeship: Łódź
- County: Poddębice
- Gmina: Poddębice

Feliksów (Polish pronunciation: [fɛˈliksuf]) is a village in the administrative district of Gmina Poddębice, within Poddębice County, Łódź Voivodeship, in central Poland.
