= Wylazłów, Gmina Poddębice =

Village in Łódź Voivodeship, Poland

Wylazłów
- Village
- Location within Poland
- Coordinates: 51°52′25″N 18°52′59″E
- Country: Poland
- Voivodeship: Łódź
- County: Poddębice
- Gmina: Poddębice
- Time zone: UTC+1 (CET)
  - Summer (DST): UTC+2 (CEST)
- Postal code: 99-200
- Vehicle registration: EPD

Wylazłów [vɨˈlazwuf] is a village in the administrative district of Gmina Poddębice, within Poddębice County, Łódź Voivodeship, in central Poland.

== History ==
Historical population
Year	Pop.
1827	37
1921	148

Wylazłów was a private village of Polish nobility, administratively located in the Szadek County in the Sieradz Voivodeship in the Greater Poland Province of the Kingdom of Poland.

According to the 1921 Polish census, the population entirely was Polish by nationality, and Catholic by confession.

During the German invasion of Poland at the start of World War II, on 7 September 1939, German troops committed a massacre of 24 Polish farmers in the village (see Nazi crimes against the Polish nation).
