= Dzierzązna, Poddębice County =

Dzierzązna
- Village
- Location within Poland
- Coordinates: 51°53′27″N 18°48′3″E
- Country: Poland
- Voivodeship: Łódź
- County: Poddębice
- Gmina: Poddębice

Dzierzązna [d͡ʑɛˈʐɔ̃zna] is a village in the administrative district of Gmina Poddębice, within Poddębice County, Łódź Voivodeship, in central Poland.
