= Kobylniki, Poddębice County =

Kobylniki
- Village
- Location within Poland
- Coordinates: 51°57′4″N 18°53′41″E
- Country: Poland
- Voivodeship: Łódź
- County: Poddębice
- Gmina: Poddębice
- Elevation: 115 m (377 ft)
- Population: 103

Kobylniki [kɔbɨlˈniki] is a village in the administrative district of Gmina Poddębice, within Poddębice County, Łódź Voivodeship, in central Poland.
