= Ewelinów, Łódź Voivodeship =

Ewelinów
- Village
- Location within Poland
- Coordinates: 51°53′40″N 18°51′13″E
- Country: Poland
- Voivodeship: Łódź
- County: Poddębice
- Gmina: Poddębice
- Population: 120

Ewelinów [ɛvɛˈlinuf] is a village in the administrative district of Gmina Poddębice, within Poddębice County, Łódź Voivodeship, in central Poland.
