= Józefów-Kolonia =

- Village
- Location within Poland
- Coordinates: 51°56′50″N 18°55′29″E
- Country: Poland
- Voivodeship: Łódź
- County: Poddębice
- Gmina: Poddębice

Józefów-Kolonia (Polish pronunciation: [juˈzɛfuf kɔˈlɔɲa]) is a village in the administrative district of Gmina Poddębice, within Poddębice County, Łódź Voivodeship, in central Poland.
