= Lipki, Łódź Voivodeship =

Lipki
- Village
- Location within Poland
- Coordinates: 51°51′6″N 18°53′21″E
- Country: Poland
- Voivodeship: Łódź
- County: Poddębice
- Gmina: Poddębice

Lipki [ˈlipki] is a village in the administrative district of Gmina Poddębice, within Poddębice County, Łódź Voivodeship, in central Poland.
