= Góra Bałdrzychowska =

- Village
- Location within Poland
- Coordinates: 51°50′57″N 18°57′45″E
- Country: Poland
- Voivodeship: Łódź
- County: Poddębice
- Gmina: Poddębice

Góra Bałdrzychowska [ˈɡura bau̯dʐɨˈxɔfska] is a village in the administrative district of Gmina Poddębice, within Poddębice County, Łódź Voivodeship, in central Poland.
