= Łężki =

- Village
- Location within Poland
- Coordinates: 51°53′N 19°0′E
- Country: Poland
- Voivodeship: Łódź
- County: Poddębice
- Gmina: Poddębice

Łężki [ˈwɛ̃ʂki] is a village in the administrative district of Gmina Poddębice, within Poddębice County, Łódź Voivodeship, in central Poland.
