= Balin, Łódź Voivodeship =

Balin
- Village
- Location within Poland
- Coordinates: 51°55′56″N 18°48′44″E
- Country: Poland
- Voivodeship: Łódź
- County: Poddębice
- Gmina: Poddębice

Population
  - Total: 110
- Time zone: UTC+1 (CET)
  - Summer (DST): UTC+2 (CEST)
- Vehicle registration: EPD

Balin [ˈbalin] is a village in the administrative district of Gmina Poddębice, within Poddębice County, Łódź Voivodeship, in central Poland.

== History ==
Balin was a private village of Polish nobility, administratively located in the Szadek County in the Sieradz Voivodeship in the Greater Poland Province of the Kingdom of Poland.

During the German invasion of Poland at the start of World War II, on 8 September 1939, German troops carried out a massacre of 21 Polish farmers in Balin (see Nazi crimes against the Polish nation). During the subsequent German occupation, in 1942, the German gendarmerie carried out expulsions of Poles, who were then enslaved as forced labour in the area.
