= Ksawercin =

- Village
- Location within Poland
- Coordinates: 51°54′0″N 18°51′20″E
- Country: Poland
- Voivodeship: Łódź
- County: Poddębice
- Gmina: Poddębice

Ksawercin [ksaˈvɛrt͡ɕin] is a village in the administrative district of Gmina Poddębice, within Poddębice County, Łódź Voivodeship, in central Poland.
