= Jabłonka, Łódź Voivodeship =

Jabłonka
- Village
- Location within Poland
- Coordinates: 51°55′17″N 18°59′23″E
- Country: Poland
- Voivodeship: Łódź
- County: Poddębice
- Gmina: Poddębice

Jabłonka [jaˈbwɔnka] is a village in the administrative district of Gmina Poddębice, within Poddębice County, Łódź Voivodeship, in central Poland.
