= Kałów =

- Village
- Location within Poland
- Coordinates: 51°50′28″N 19°0′41″E
- Country: Poland
- Voivodeship: Łódź
- County: Poddębice
- Gmina: Poddębice

Kałów [ˈkawuf] is a village in the administrative district of Gmina Poddębice, within Poddębice County, Łódź Voivodeship, in central Poland.
