= Chropy-Kolonia =

- Village
- Location within Poland
- Coordinates: 51°54′39″N 18°56′18″E
- Country: Poland
- Voivodeship: Łódź
- County: Poddębice
- Gmina: Poddębice

Chropy-Kolonia [ˈxrɔpɨ kɔˈlɔɲa] is a village in the administrative district of Gmina Poddębice, within Poddębice County, Łódź Voivodeship, in central Poland.
