= Stary Pudłów =

- Village
- Location within Poland
- Coordinates: 51°49′59″N 18°55′44″E
- Country: Poland
- Voivodeship: Łódź
- County: Poddębice
- Gmina: Poddębice

Stary Pudłów [ˈstarɨ ˈpudwuf] is a village in the administrative district of Gmina Poddębice, within Poddębice County, Łódź Voivodeship, in central Poland.
