= Malenie, Poddębice County =

Malenie
- Village
- Location within Poland
- Coordinates: 51°51′39″N 18°52′04″E
- Country: Poland
- Voivodeship: Łódź
- County: Poddębice
- Gmina: Poddębice

Malenie [maˈlɛɲɛ] is a village in the administrative district of Gmina Poddębice, within Poddębice County, Łódź Voivodeship, in central Poland.
