= Podgórcze =

- Village
- Location within Poland
- Coordinates: 51°52′N 18°54′E
- Country: Poland
- Voivodeship: Łódź
- County: Poddębice
- Gmina: Poddębice
- Population (approx.): 60

Podgórcze [pɔdˈɡurt͡ʂɛ] is a village in the administrative district of Gmina Poddębice, within Poddębice County, Łódź Voivodeship, in central Poland.

The village has an approximate population of 60.
