= Wólka, Gmina Poddębice =

Wólka
- Village
- Location within Poland
- Coordinates: 51°50′46″N 18°59′39″E
- Country: Poland
- Voivodeship: Łódź
- County: Poddębice
- Gmina: Poddębice

Wólka [ˈvulka] is a village in the administrative district of Gmina Poddębice, within Poddębice County, Łódź Voivodeship, in central Poland.
