= Bałdrzychów =

- Village
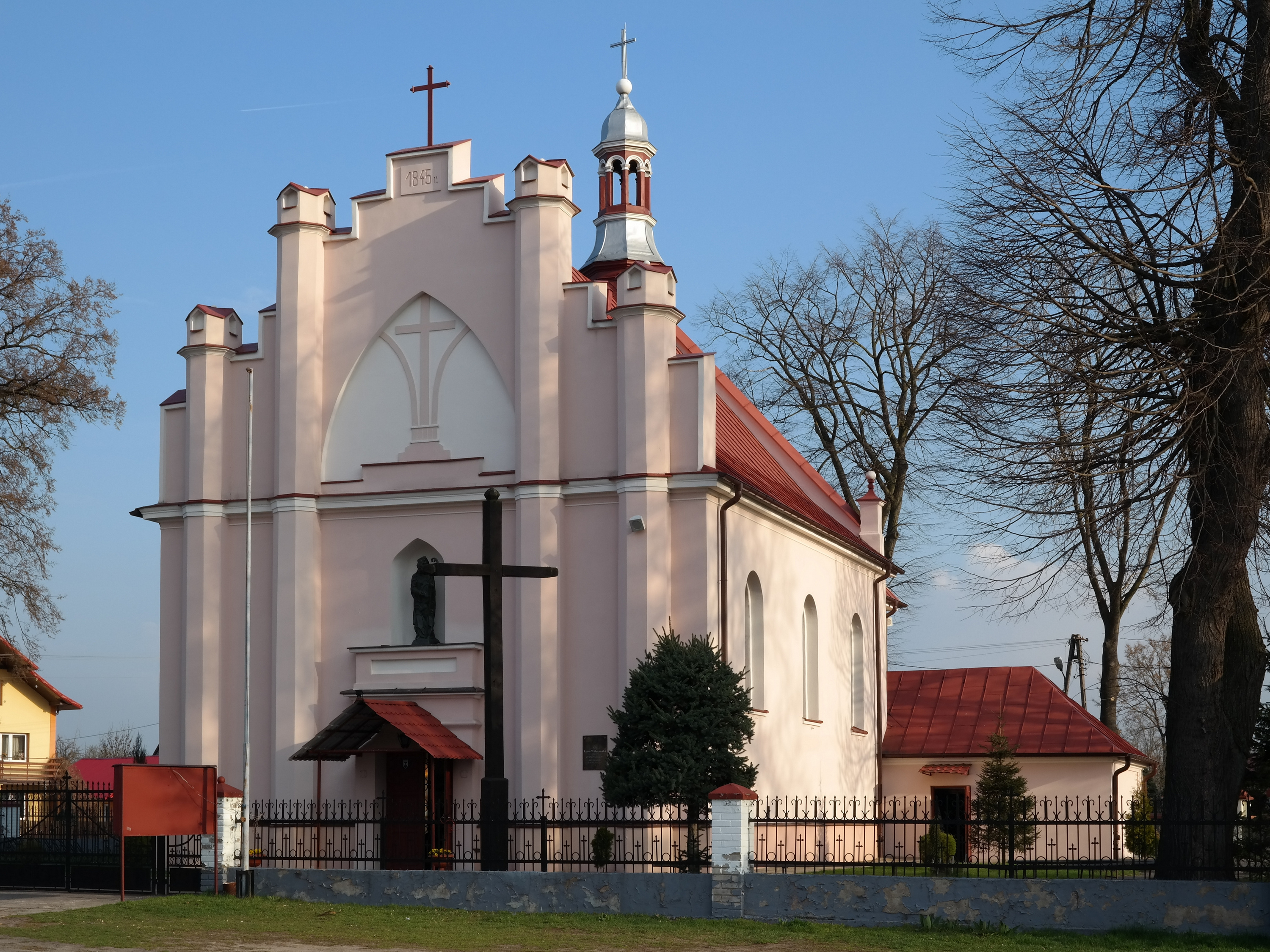
- Church of Saint Giles

- Location within Poland
- Coordinates: 51°52′N 18°55′E
- Country: Poland
- Voivodeship: Łódź
- County: Poddębice
- Gmina: Poddębice

Population
  - Total: 440

Bałdrzychów [bau̯ˈdʐɨxuf] is a village in the administrative district of Gmina Poddębice, within Poddębice County, Łódź Voivodeship, in central Poland.
