= Leśnik, Łódź Voivodeship =

Leśnik
- Village
- Location within Poland
- Coordinates: 51°54′21″N 18°45′29″E
- Country: Poland
- Voivodeship: Łódź
- County: Poddębice
- Gmina: Poddębice

Leśnik [ˈlɛɕnik] is a village in the administrative district of Gmina Poddębice, within Poddębice County, Łódź Voivodeship, in central Poland.
