= Niewiesz-Kolonia =

- Village
- Location within Poland
- Coordinates: 51°55′50″N 18°51′2″E
- Country: Poland
- Voivodeship: Łódź
- County: Poddębice
- Gmina: Poddębice

Niewiesz-Kolonia [ˈɲɛvjɛʂ kɔˈlɔɲa] is a village in the administrative district of Gmina Poddębice, within Poddębice County, Łódź Voivodeship, in central Poland.
