= Pudłówek =

- Village
- Location within Poland
- Coordinates: 51°50′N 18°55′E
- Country: Poland
- Voivodeship: Łódź
- County: Poddębice
- Gmina: Poddębice

Pudłówek [pudˈwuvɛk] is a village in the administrative district of Gmina Poddębice, within Poddębice County, Łódź Voivodeship, in central Poland.
