= Rąkczyn =

- Village
- Location within Poland
- Coordinates: 51°52′N 18°58′E
- Country: Poland
- Voivodeship: Łódź
- County: Poddębice
- Gmina: Poddębice

Rąkczyn [ˈrɔŋkt͡ʂɨn] is a village in the administrative district of Gmina Poddębice, within Poddębice County, Łódź Voivodeship, in central Poland.
