= Wilczków, Poddębice County =

Wilczków
- Village
- Location within Poland
- Coordinates: 51°55′40″N 18°54′35″E
- Country: Poland
- Voivodeship: Łódź
- County: Poddębice
- Gmina: Poddębice

Wilczków [ˈvilt͡ʂkuf] is a village in the administrative district of Gmina Poddębice, within Poddębice County, Łódź Voivodeship, in central Poland.
