= Karnice, Łódź Voivodeship =

Karnice
- Village
- Location within Poland
- Coordinates: 51°56′4″N 18°56′25″E
- Country: Poland
- Voivodeship: Łódź
- County: Poddębice
- Gmina: Poddębice

Karnice [karˈnit͡sɛ] is a village in the administrative district of Gmina Poddębice, within Poddębice County, Łódź Voivodeship, in central Poland.
