= Grocholice, Poddębice County =

Grocholice
- Village
- Location within Poland
- Coordinates: 51°55′51″N 18°50′8″E
- Country: Poland
- Voivodeship: Łódź
- County: Poddębice
- Gmina: Poddębice

Grocholice [ɡrɔxɔˈlit͡sɛ] is a village in the administrative district of Gmina Poddębice, within Poddębice County, Łódź Voivodeship, in central Poland.
