= Małe, Łódź Voivodeship =

Małe
- Village
- Location within Poland
- Coordinates: 51°55′29″N 18°58′27″E
- Country: Poland
- Voivodeship: Łódź
- County: Poddębice
- Gmina: Poddębice

Małe [ˈmawɛ] is a village in the administrative district of Gmina Poddębice, within Poddębice County, Łódź Voivodeship, in central Poland.
