= Józefów, Gmina Poddębice =

Józefów
- Village
- Location within Poland
- Coordinates: 51°57′7″N 18°50′27″E
- Country: Poland
- Voivodeship: Łódź
- County: Poddębice
- Gmina: Poddębice

Józefów (Polish pronunciation: [juˈzɛfuf]) is a village in the administrative district of Gmina Poddębice, within Poddębice County, Łódź Voivodeship, in central Poland.
