= Gibaszew =

- Village
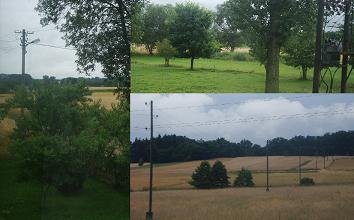
- Coat of arms

- Location within Poland
- Coordinates: 51°53′56″N 18°48′14″E
- Country: Poland
- Voivodeship: Łódź
- County: Poddębice
- Gmina: Poddębice

Gibaszew [ɡiˈbaʂɛf] is a village in the administrative district of Gmina Poddębice, within Poddębice County, Łódź Voivodeship, in central Poland.
