= Lipnica, Łódź Voivodeship =

Lipnica
- Village
- Location within Poland
- Coordinates: 51°56′N 18°51′E
- Country: Poland
- Voivodeship: Łódź
- County: Poddębice
- Gmina: Poddębice
- Population: 300

Lipnica (Polish pronunciation: [lipˈɲit͡sa]) is a village in the administrative district of Gmina Poddębice, within Poddębice County, Łódź Voivodeship, in central Poland.
