= Niemysłów =

- Village
- Location within Poland
- Coordinates: 51°52′7″N 18°49′13″E
- Country: Poland
- Voivodeship: Łódź
- County: Poddębice
- Gmina: Poddębice
- Population: 390

Niemysłów [ɲɛˈmɨswuf] is a village in the administrative district of Gmina Poddębice, within Poddębice County, Łódź Voivodeship, in central Poland.
