= Krępa, Poddębice County =

Krępa
- Village
- Location within Poland
- Coordinates: 51°53′14″N 18°50′28″E
- Country: Poland
- Voivodeship: Łódź
- County: Poddębice
- Gmina: Poddębice

Krępa [ˈkrɛmpa] is a village in the administrative district of Gmina Poddębice, within Poddębice County, Łódź Voivodeship, in central Poland.
