= Zagórzyce, Łódź Voivodeship =

Zagórzyce
- Village
- Location within Poland
- Coordinates: 51°51′31″N 18°56′17″E
- Country: Poland
- Voivodeship: Łódź
- County: Poddębice
- Gmina: Poddębice

Zagórzyce [zaɡuˈʐɨt͡sɛ] is a village in the administrative district of Gmina Poddębice, within Poddębice County, Łódź Voivodeship, in central Poland.
