= Golice, Łódź Voivodeship =

Golice
- Village
- Location within Poland
- Coordinates: 51°55′23″N 19°0′22″E
- Country: Poland
- Voivodeship: Łódź
- County: Poddębice
- Gmina: Poddębice

Golice [ɡɔˈlit͡sɛ] is a village in the administrative district of Gmina Poddębice, within Poddębice County, Łódź Voivodeship, in central Poland.
