= Nowa Wieś, Gmina Poddębice =

Nowa Wieś
- Village
- Location within Poland
- Coordinates: 51°53′0″N 18°52′25″E
- Country: Poland
- Voivodeship: Łódź
- County: Poddębice
- Gmina: Poddębice

Nowa Wieś [ˈnɔva ˈvjɛɕ] is a village in the administrative district of Gmina Poddębice, within Poddębice County, Łódź Voivodeship, in central Poland.
