= Praga, Łódź Voivodeship =

Praga
- Village
- Location within Poland
- Coordinates: 51°53′20″N 18°55′44″E
- Country: Poland
- Voivodeship: Łódź
- County: Poddębice
- Gmina: Poddębice

Praga [ˈpraɡa] is a village in the administrative district of Gmina Poddębice, within Poddębice County, Łódź Voivodeship, in central Poland.
