= Borzewisko, Poddębice County =

Borzewisko
- Village
- Location within Poland
- Coordinates: 51°55′N 18°47′E
- Country: Poland
- Voivodeship: Łódź
- County: Poddębice
- Gmina: Poddębice

Borzewisko [bɔʐɛˈviskɔ] is a village in the administrative district of Gmina Poddębice, within Poddębice County, Łódź Voivodeship, in central Poland.
