= Dominikowice, Łódź Voivodeship =

Dominikowice
- Village
- Location within Poland
- Coordinates: 51°55′46″N 18°48′59″E
- Country: Poland
- Voivodeship: Łódź
- County: Poddębice
- Gmina: Poddębice
- Time zone: UTC+1 (CET)
  - Summer (DST): UTC+2 (CEST)
- Vehicle registration: EPD

Dominikowice [dɔminikɔˈvit͡sɛ] is a village in the administrative district of Gmina Poddębice, within Poddębice County, Łódź Voivodeship, in central Poland.

== History ==
Dominikowice was a private village of Polish nobility, administratively located in the Szadek County in the Sieradz Voivodeship in the Greater Poland Province of the Kingdom of Poland.

During the German invasion of Poland at the start of World War II, on 8 September 1939, German troops carried out a massacre of 23 Poles, including a 14-year-old girl (see Nazi crimes against the Polish nation).
