= Sempółki =

- Village
- Location within Poland
- Coordinates: 51°56′29″N 18°50′7″E
- Country: Poland
- Voivodeship: Łódź
- County: Poddębice
- Gmina: Poddębice

Sempółki [sɛmˈpuu̯ki] is a village in the administrative district of Gmina Poddębice, within Poddębice County, Łódź Voivodeship, in central Poland.
