= Gmina Poddębice =

Administrative district in Łódź Voivodeship, Poland

Gmina Poddębice Poddębice Commune
- Gmina
- Coat of arms
- Interactive map of Gmina Poddębice
- Coordinates (Poddębice): 51°54′N 18°58′E
- Country: Poland
- Voivodeship: Łódź
- County: Poddębice
- Seat: Poddębice

Area
  - Total: 224.66 km^{2} (86.74 sq mi)

Population (2006)
  - Total: 15,923
  - Density: 70.876/km^{2} (183.57/sq mi)
  - Urban: 7,875
  - Rural: 8,048
- Website: http://www.gmina.poddebice.pl/

Gmina Poddębice is an urban-rural gmina (administrative district) in Poddębice County, Łódź Voivodeship, in central Poland. Its seat is the town of Poddębice, which lies approximately 37 kilometres (23 mi) west of the regional capital Łódź.

The gmina covers an area of 224.66 square kilometres (86.7 sq mi), and as of 2006 its total population is 15,923 (out of which the population of Poddębice amounts to 7,875, and the population of the rural part of the gmina is 8,048).

== Communities ==
Gmina Poddębice contains the villages and settlements of

- Adamów
- Antonina
- Bałdrzychów
- Balin
- Bliźnia
- Borzewisko
- Busina
- Chropy
- Chropy-Kolonia
- Dominikowice
- Dzierzązna
- Ewelinów
- Feliksów
- Gibaszew
- Golice
- Góra Bałdrzychowska
- Góra Bałdrzychowska-Kolonia
- Grocholice
- Jabłonka
- Józefów
- Józefów-Kolonia
- Kałów
- Karnice
- Klementów
- Kobylniki
- Krępa
- Ksawercin
- Leśnik
- Łężki
- Lipki
- Lipnica
- Lubiszewice
- Małe
- Malenie
- Niemysłów
- Niewiesz
- Niewiesz-Kolonia
- Nowa Wieś
- Nowy Pudłów
- Panaszew
- Poddębice - Gmina seat
- Podgórcze
- Porczyny
- Praga
- Pudłówek
- Rąkczyn
- Sempółki
- Stary Pudłów
- Sworawa
- Szarów
- Tarnowa
- Tumusin
- Wilczków
- Wólka
- Zagórzyce

== Neighbouring gminas ==
Gmina Poddębice is bordered by the gminas of Dalików, Dobra, Lutomiersk, Pęczniew, Uniejów, Wartkowice and Zadzim.
