= Szarów, Łódź Voivodeship =

Szarów
- Village
- Location within Poland
- Coordinates: 51°57′06″N 18°51′54″E
- Country: Poland
- Voivodeship: Łódź
- County: Poddębice
- Gmina: Poddębice
- Elevation: 115 m (377 ft)
- Population: 128

Szarów [ˈʂaruf] is a village in the administrative district of Gmina Poddębice, within Poddębice County, Łódź Voivodeship, in central Poland.
