= Uniejów =

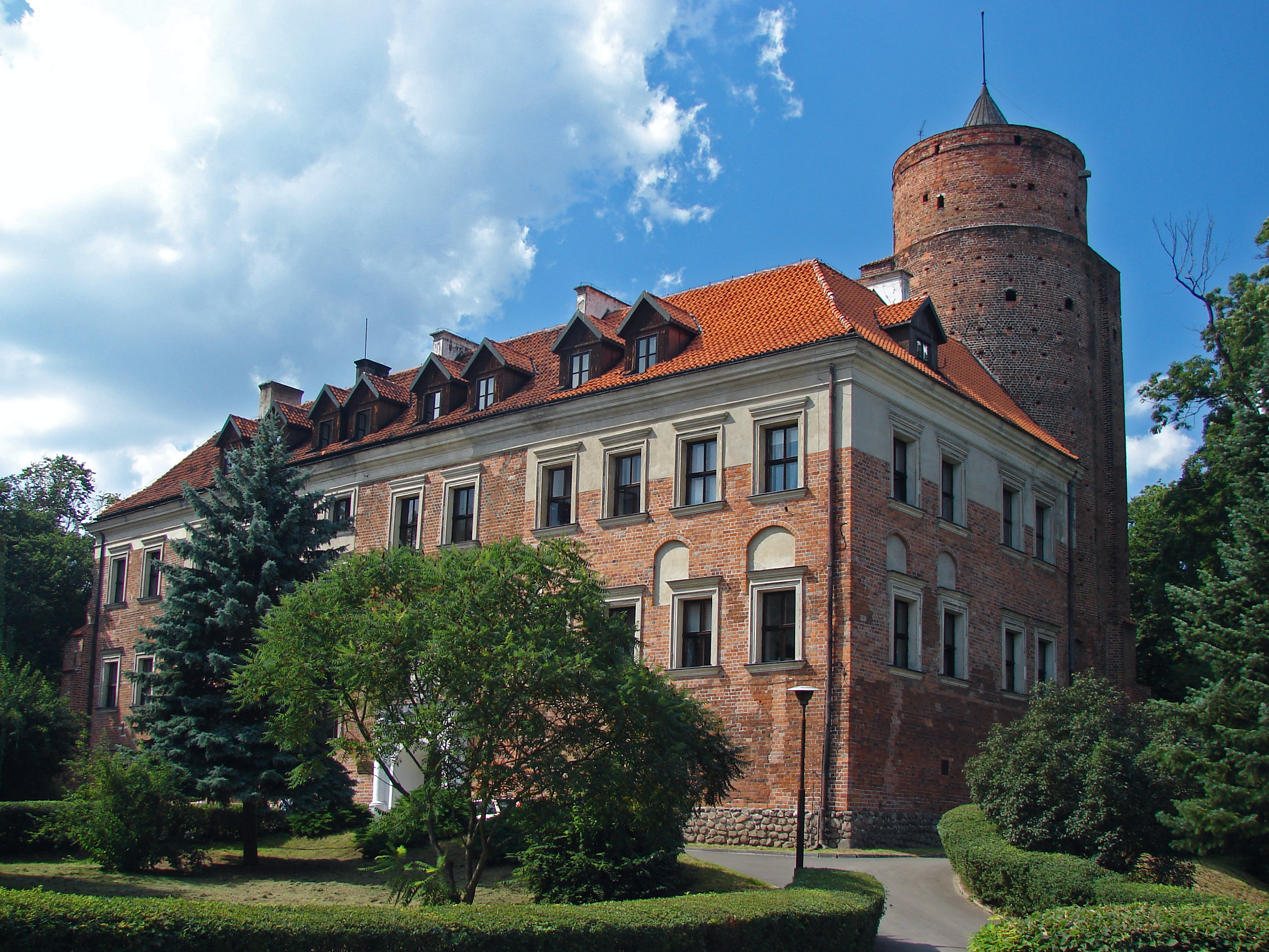
- Medieval Castle of the Archbishops of Gniezno

- Flag Coat of arms

- Location within Poland
- Coordinates: 51°58′12″N 18°48′1″E
- Country: Poland
- Voivodeship: Łódź
- County: Poddębice
- Gmina: Uniejów
- First mentioned: 1136
- Town rights: before 1290

Government
  - Mayor: Józef Kaczmarek

Area
  - Total: 12 km^{2} (4.6 sq mi)

Population (31 December 2020)
  - Total: 2,957 ▼
  - Density: 246/km^{2} (640/sq mi)
- Time zone: UTC+1 (CET)
  - Summer (DST): UTC+2 (CEST)
- Postal code: 99-210
- Vehicle registration: EPD
- Website: http://www.uniejow.pl

Uniejów [uˈɲɛjuf] is a spa town in Poddębice County, Łódź Voivodeship in central Poland, with 2,957 inhabitants (2020). It is the seat of the local government of Gmina Uniejów.

The town lies within the historic Sieradz Land, in northwestern corner of Poddębice County, near the border with Greater Poland Voivodeship. Uniejów is known for its Thermal Park and the 14th-century castle with a landscape park (34 hectares (84 acres)).

== History ==
The history of the town dates back to the early years of Polish statehood. Mentioned as Uneievo in a bull of Pope Innocent II (1136), Uniejów is one of the oldest towns of Poland. At that time it belonged to the Archbishops of Gniezno, and received its town charter most likely before 1290. The first Archbishop residing mainly in Uniejów in the city was Bogumilus in the 12th century. In the late 13th century, Archbishop Jakub Świnka founded Church of the Holy Spirit and a hospital, and in 1331, Uniejów was burned by the Teutonic Knights. The town was rebuilt, and in the late 14th-early 15th century, it was a local center of commerce and crafts. For centuries, Uniejów enjoyed several privileges, granted to it by the Archbishops of Gniezno. In 1360–1365, a defensive castle was built here. It became one of residences of the Archbishops, here several councils and meetings took place. The first synod of the Polish Catholic church was held in Uniejów in 1376. In 1520, Archbishop and Primate of Poland Jan Łaski merged the Old Town, New Town and suburbs into one entity. In the 16th century the town lost its importance after the Primates of Poland built new residences in Łowicz and Skierniewice. Uniejów was a private church town, administratively located in the Szadek County in the Sieradz Voivodeship in the Greater Poland Province of the Kingdom of Poland.

Like many Polish cities, Uniejów declined after the mid-17th century Swedish invasion of Poland. The castle was ransacked, and the town itself was burned. There also were two dangerous fires, in 1736 and 1790, and after the Congress of Vienna (1815), the town became part of Russian-controlled Congress Poland, where it remained until World War I. In 1836, Uniejów was granted to a Tsarist General Karl Wilhelm von Toll. During the January Uprising, it was the site of a battle between Polish insurgents and Russian troops on October 12, 1863. As punishment for the unsuccessful uprising, Uniejów was one of many towns stripped of its town charter in 1870. In 1919 Uniejów again became a town after Poland regained independence in 1918.

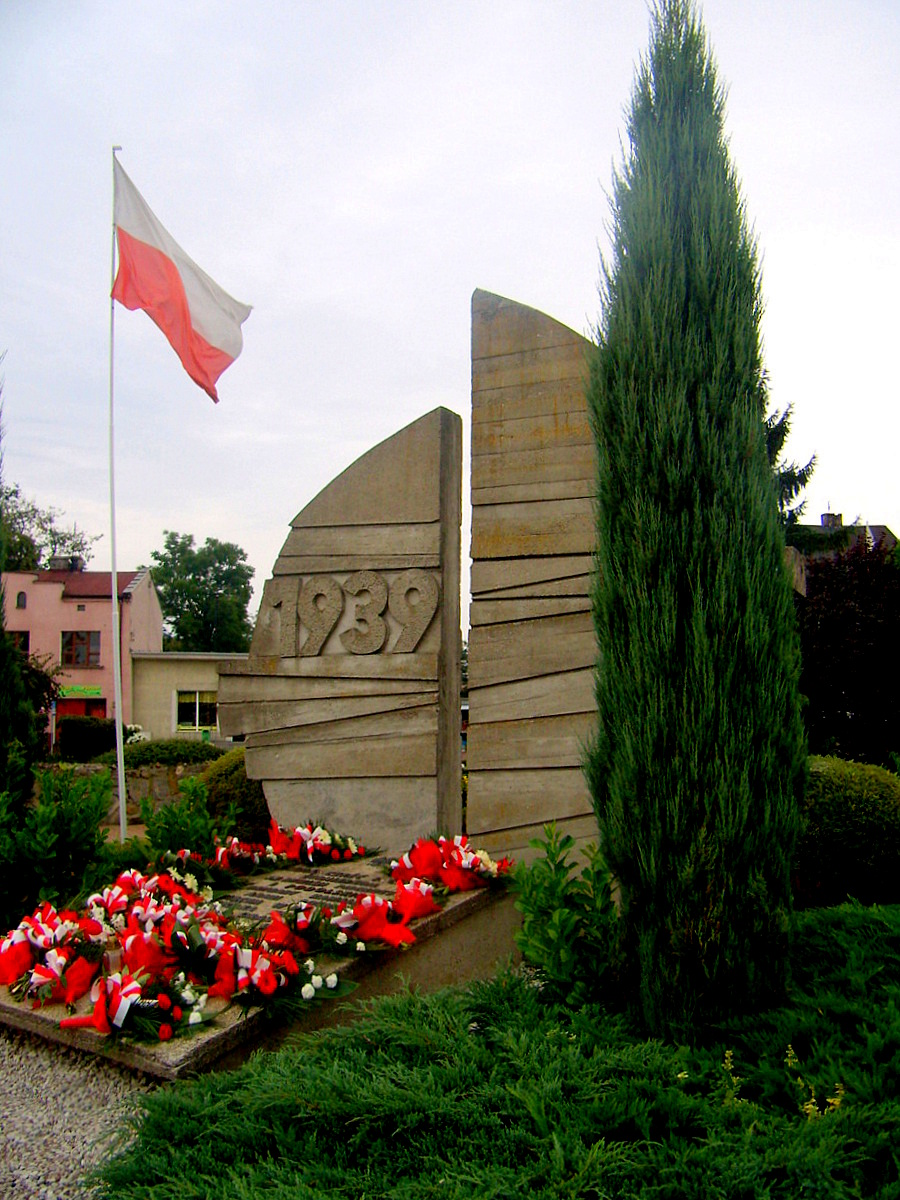
Memorial to 1939 Polish defenders of Uniejów

In September 1939, during the German invasion of Poland, which started World War II, Polish units of Poznań Army resisted here the advancing Wehrmacht. During the heavy fighting, Uniejów was partially burned. In revenge for the Polish defense, the Germans carried out two massacres of Polish inhabitants, killing 36 and 14 people respectively on September 6 and 8. The Jewish population of Uniejów, numbering slightly over 1,000 was immediately brutalized by the invaders, kidnapped for forced labor, beaten, and robbed. In 1940, they were moved into a ghetto in the more decrepit part of town and the following year, the entire Jewish population of around 500 was forced to live in four buildings. Some able bodied men were sent to work camps near Poznań. In April 1940, the Germans arrested local Polish teachers. The local school principal and teachers were among Polish teachers murdered in the Mauthausen concentration camp. In June 1940, the Germans expelled 88 Poles, whose homes were handed over to German colonists as part of the Lebensraum policy. In October 1941, all the community's Jewish population was sent to a ghetto in Kowale Pańskie where in July 1942 most were sent to the Chełmno extermination camp where they were immediately gassed. A few were sent to the Łódź Ghetto. There were few survivors among Uniejów's Jewish population, perhaps around 20. Men of the nationalist Polish underground murdered one survivor in the Turek Forest in late 1945, months after the war ended.

Currently, Uniejów is a spa and tourist destination, due to its landscape park and geothermal waters. The town has several restaurants, hotel located in the castle, and other amenities. There also are walking and bicycle trails. Among sights are Gothic castle (built in 1360-1365 by Archbishop Jaroslaw of Bogoria and Skotnik, restored in 1956–67), collegiate with a 14th-century Gothic presbytery, neo-Baroque church tower (1901), Classicistic manor house (1845). The village of Spycimierz, with its ancient Slavic gord, lies four kilometres (2.5 miles) away.

== Thermal spa ==
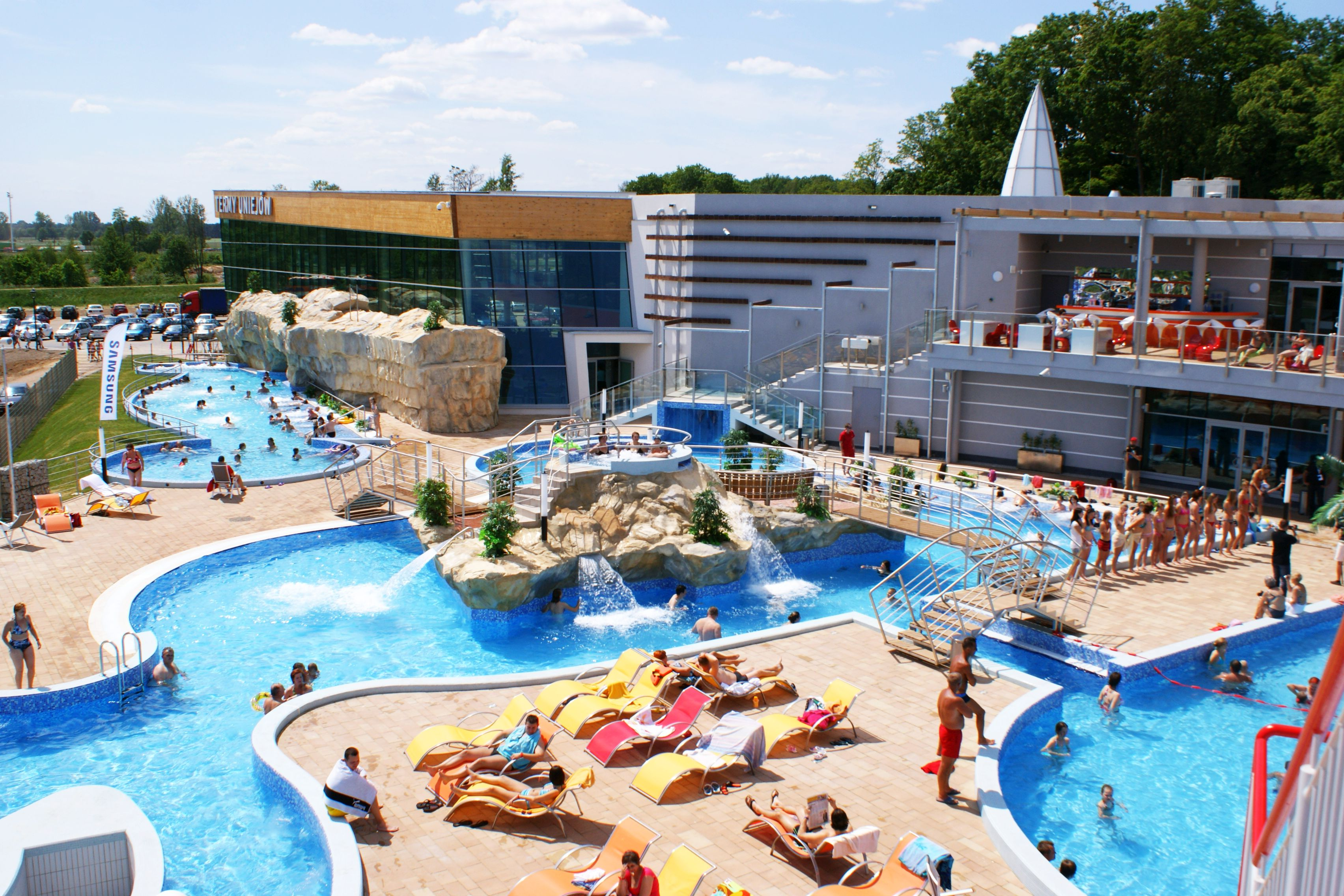
Uniejów Thermal Park

Geothermal water exploited by Uniejów Municipality has been used in balneotherapy since the 1990s. Positive opinions of people using the thermal bath, the natural and landscape potential of the Municipality, its tourist and recreational values prompted the local authorities to apply for the status of a health resort. The milestones:

- In 2008 the National Institute of Public Health -National Institute of Hygiene issued a certificate on the healing properties of water from the PIG / AGH-2 spring.
- In the same year, a certificate was issued confirming the healing properties of the Uniejów climate together with an assessment of bioclimatic conditions, as well as a climatic survey, developed by Stanisław Leszczycki Institute of Geography and Spatial Management – Polish Academy of Sciences in Warsaw.
- Based on these documents in 2011, a positive opinion for Uniejów resort was issued - the main document of the spa resort.
- In the same year, the Minister of Health issued a decision confirming the possibility of spa treatment in the Municipality of Uniejów. The following diseases can be treated here: orthopedic and traumatic, nervous, rheumatological, peripheral nervous system, skin.
- In 2012, the Prime Minister signed a regulation on granting the status of a health resort to the town of Uniejów together with the villages of: Spycimierz, Spycimierz-Kolonia, Zieleń and Człopy.

Due to the fact that the basis for spa treatment in Uniejów is geothermal water, the town of Uniejów has been given the status of a "thermal spa".

== Places of interest ==
- Uniejów Castle and castle park: the castle tower, the yard and the underground room are opened to visitors. Guided tours are available. The tower is accessible from April to the end of November. The visitors can take a walk through the 19th century English landscape garden with various nature monuments.
- The 14th-century collegiate church located near the market square. The elements that are of the greatest historic importance include the 14th-century cross-ribbed vaulting, and the bronze sarcophagus, dating back to 1666, of St. Bogumił. The chapel and the sarcophagus have been renovated recently. The archbishop's relics are still kept in the collegiate. Near the church there is the 25-metre-high neo-Baroque bell tower.
- Uniejów Thermal Park: consists of a number of both outdoor and indoor thermal pools. The water temperature is 33 °C in summer and 35 °C in winter. The buildings are entirely heated with geo-thermal energy. Uniejów Thermal Park was awarded in the prestigious “The Seven Wonders of Poland” competition which has been organized by the National Geographic Traveler (Polish edition). It is open to visitors 365 days in a year.

== Notable residents ==
- Ewa Pajor (born 1996), footballer for the Poland national team
- Szczepan Ścibor (1903–1952), soldier, pilot
- Marcin Tybura (born 1985), mixed martial artist

== Gallery ==
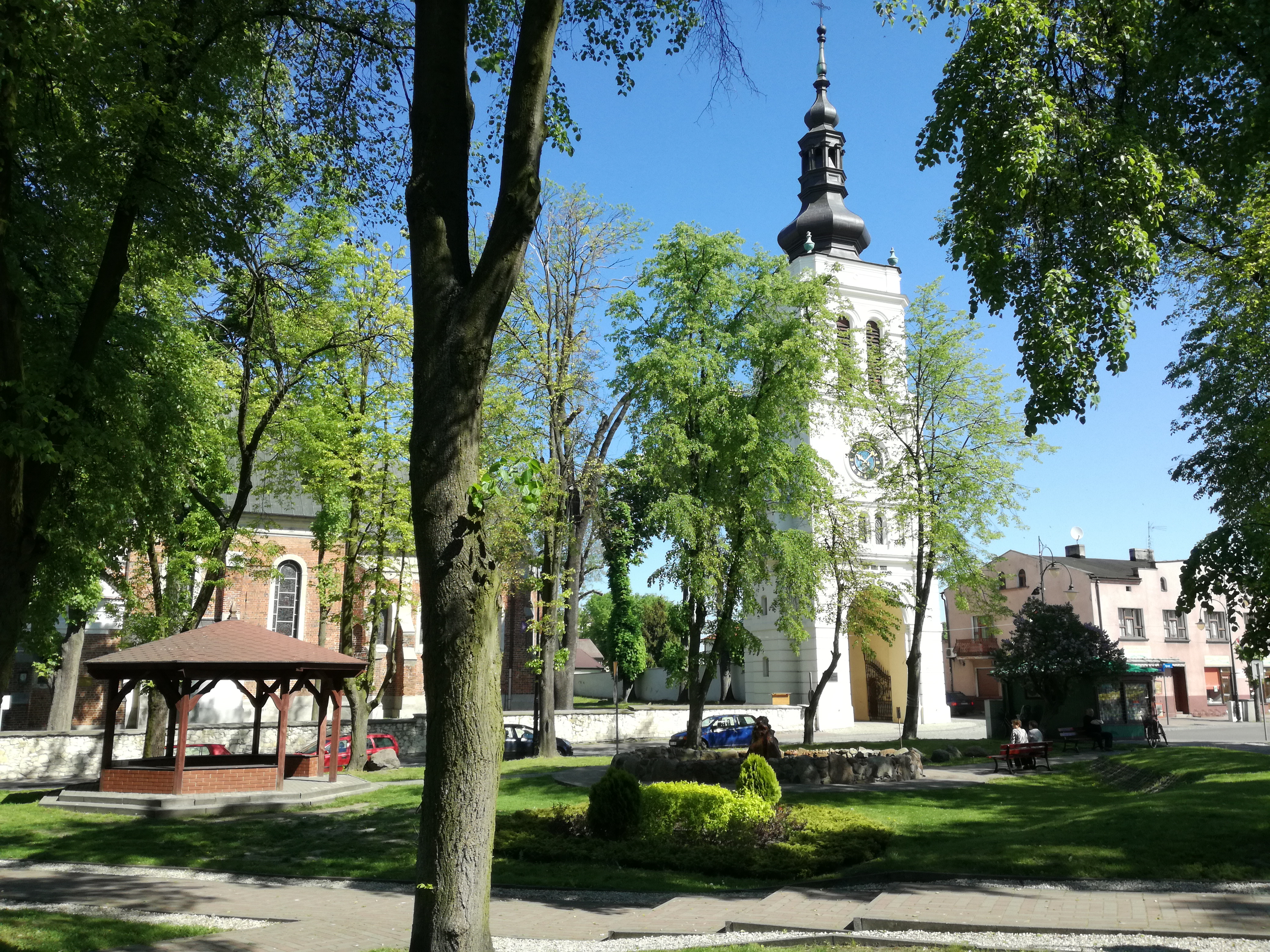
The market square, the collegiate church and the bell tower

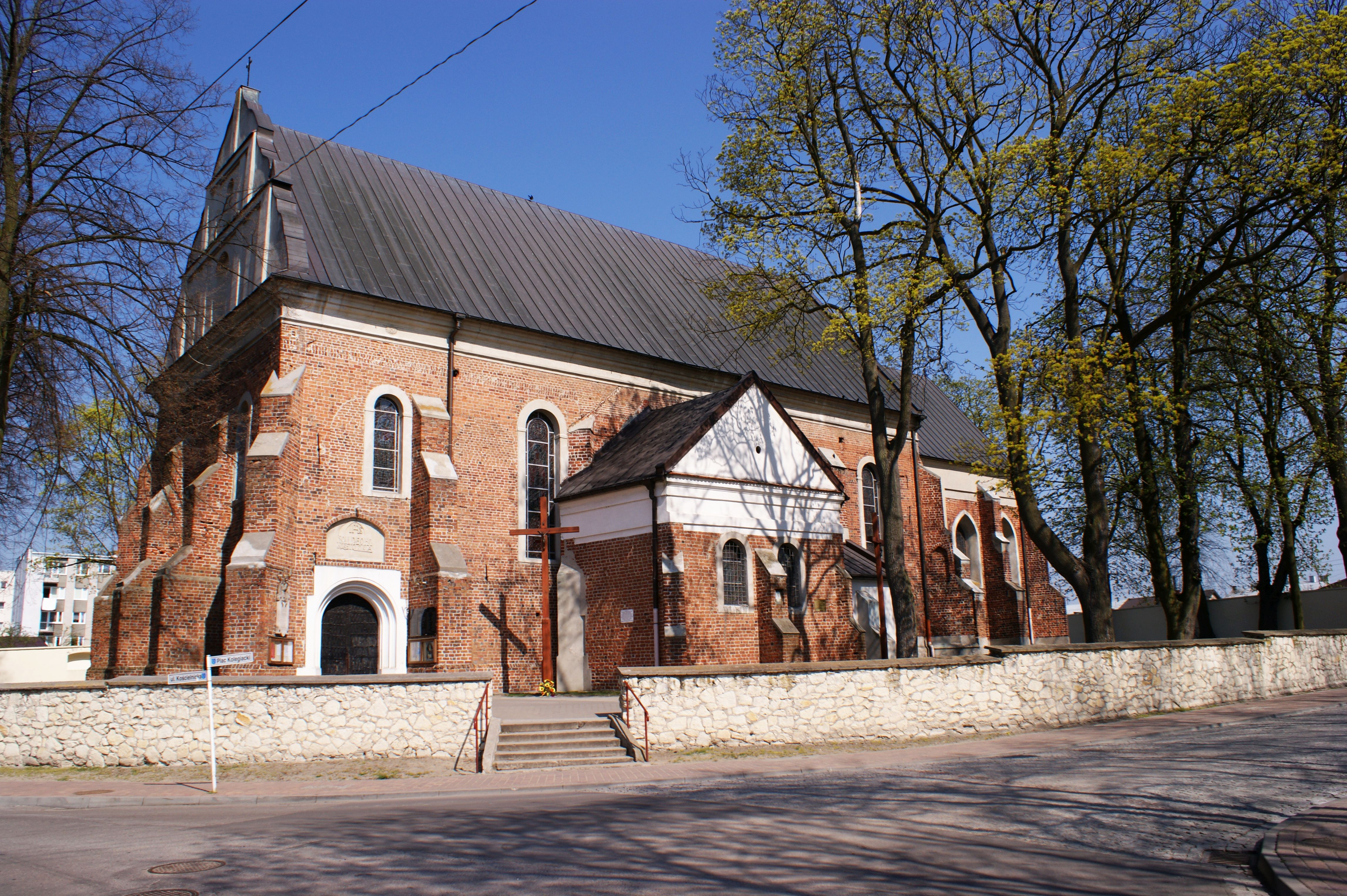
14th-century Collegiate church

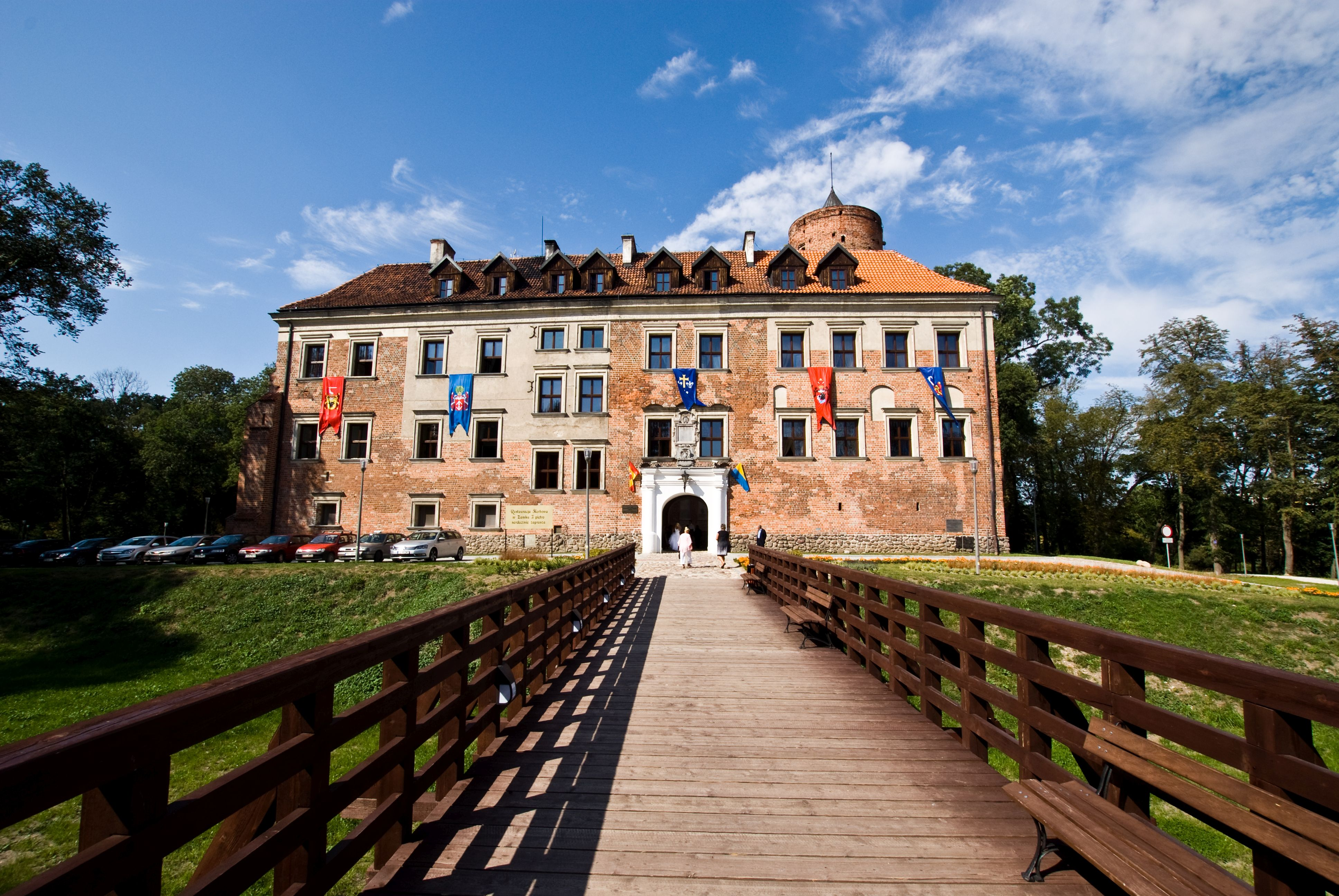
14th century Castle of the Archbishops of Gniezno

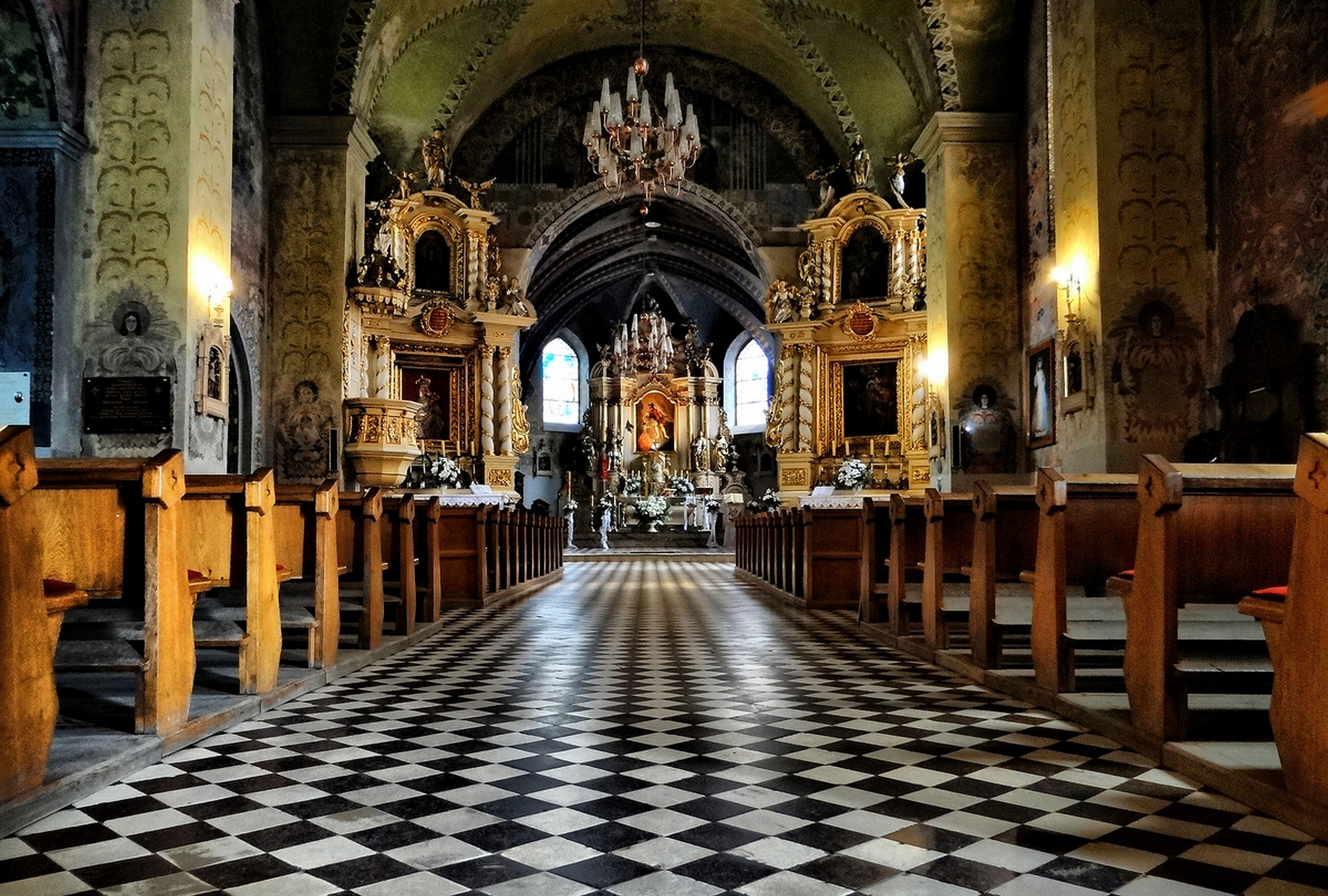
Collegiate Church interior

== Transport ==
Uniejów lies on the intersection of national road 72 and vovoideship roads 473 and 469.

National road 72 connects Uniejów to Konin to the west and to Łódź to the east.

The nearest railway station is in Koło.
