= Orzeszków =

Orzeszków may refer to the following places in Poland:

- Orzeszków, Lower Silesian Voivodeship (south-west Poland)
- Orzeszków, Gmina Uniejów in Łódź Voivodeship (central Poland)
- Orzeszków, Gmina Wartkowice in Łódź Voivodeship (central Poland)
