= Pęgów =

Pęgów may refer to the following places in Poland:

- Pęgów, Lower Silesian Voivodeship (south-west Poland)
- Pęgów, Łódź Voivodeship (central Poland)
