= Rozniatow =

Rozniatow may refer to the following places in Europe:

- Rozhniativ, Ukraine (southwestern Ukraine)
- Rożniatów, Łódź Voivodeship (central Poland)
- Rożniatów, Subcarpathian Voivodeship (south-east Poland)
- Rożniątów, Opole Voivodeship (south-west Poland)
