= Sieradz Land =

Historical region in Poland

Sieradz Land Ziemia sieradzka
- Historical region
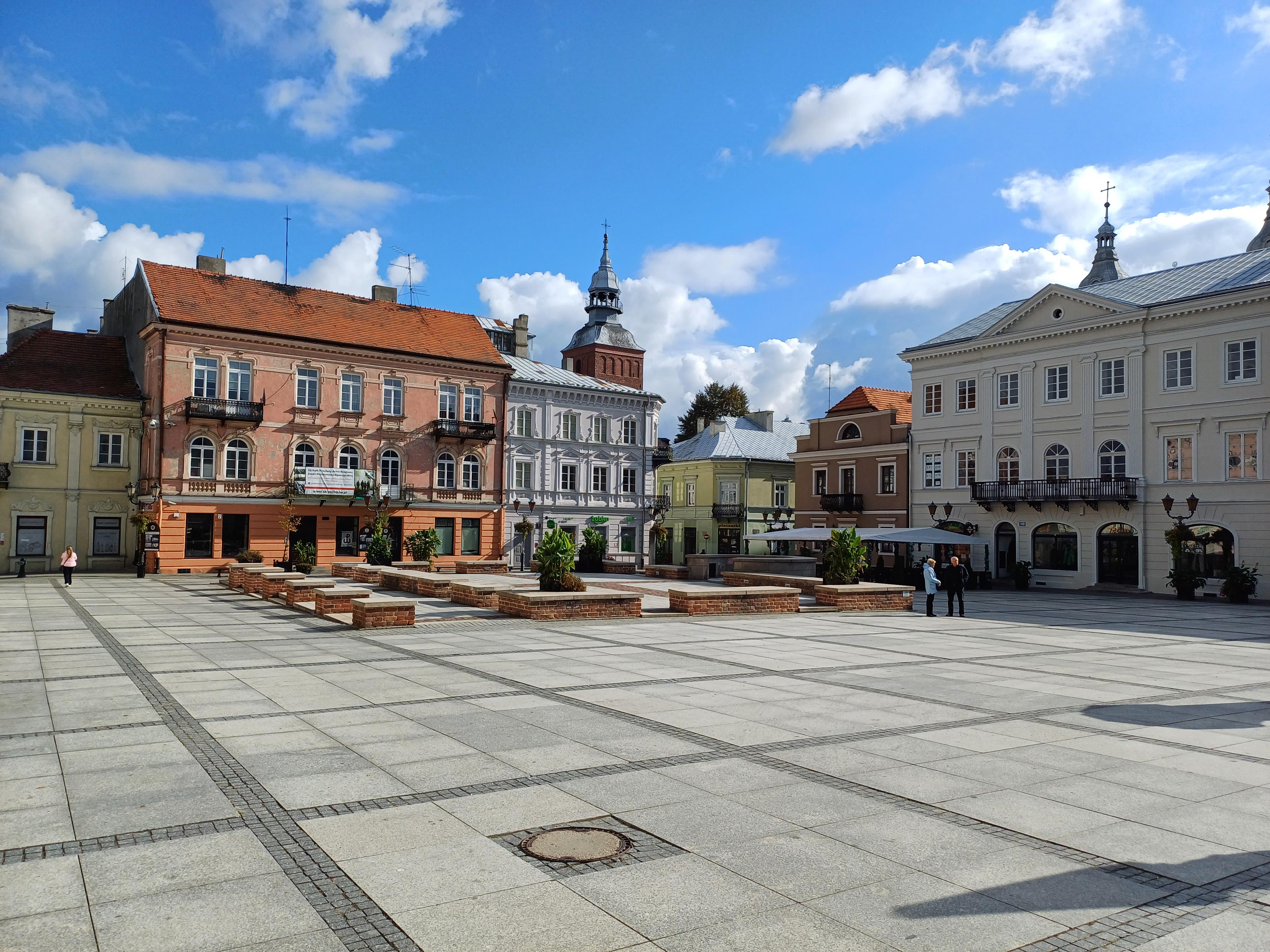
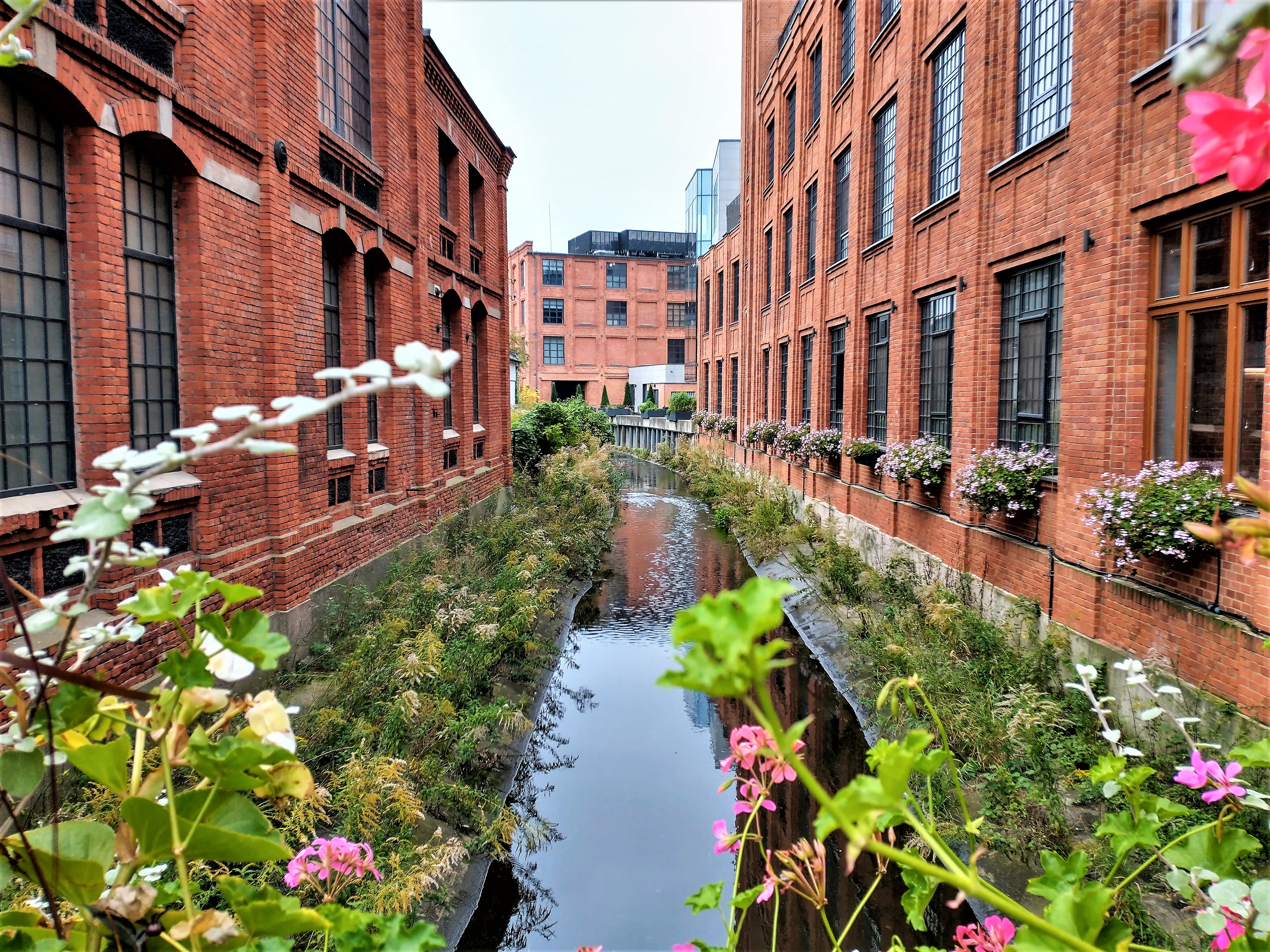
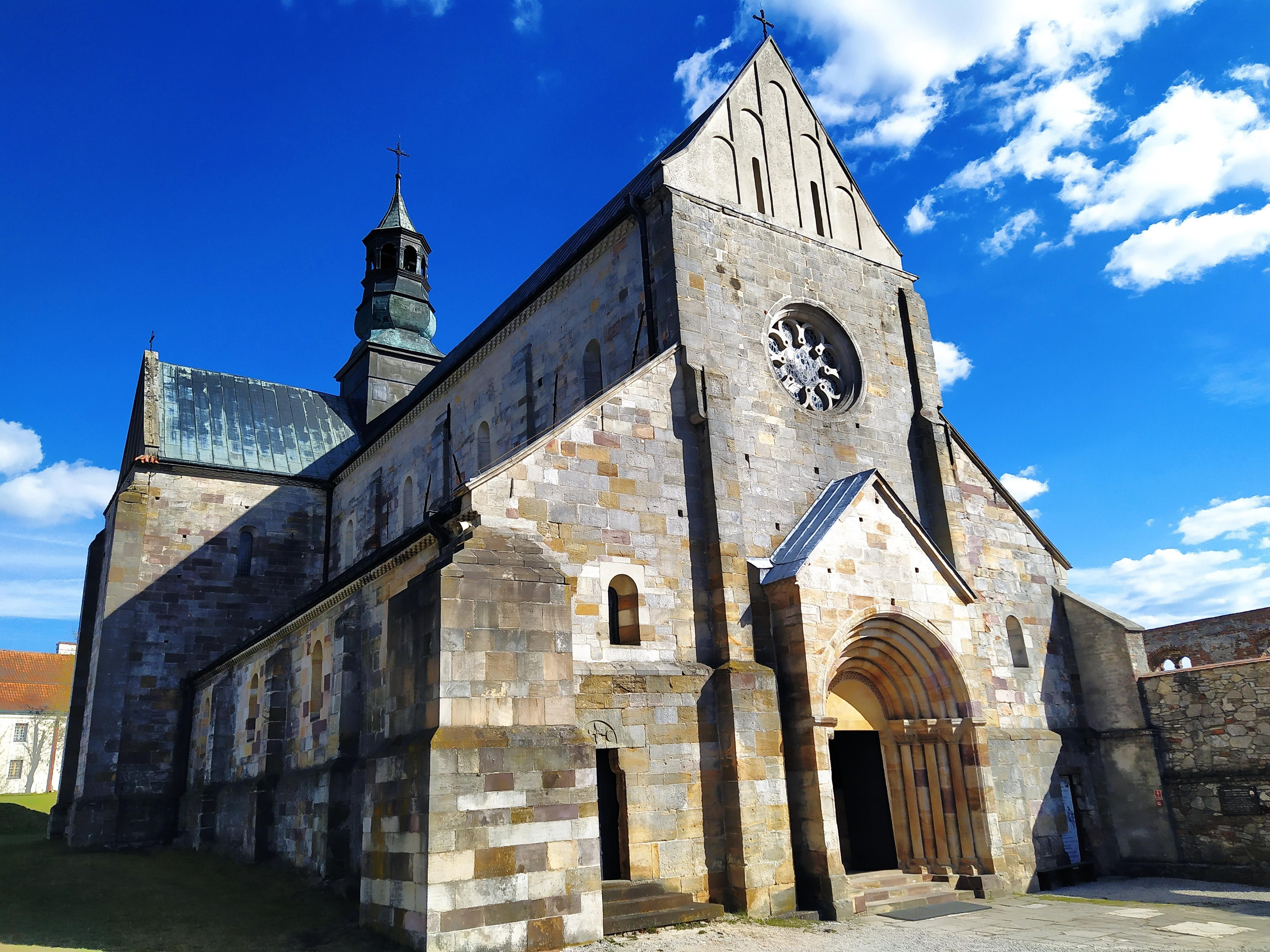
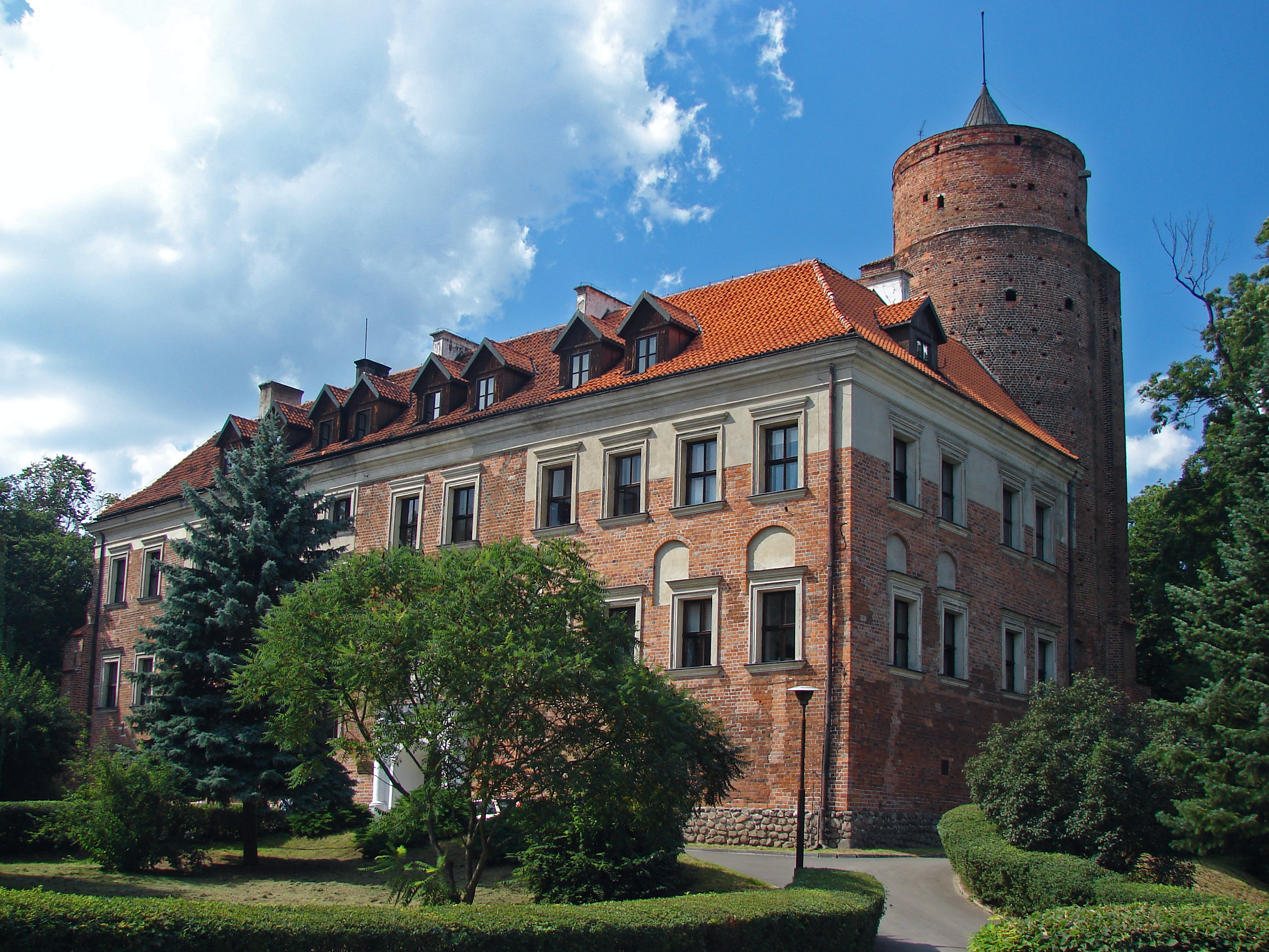
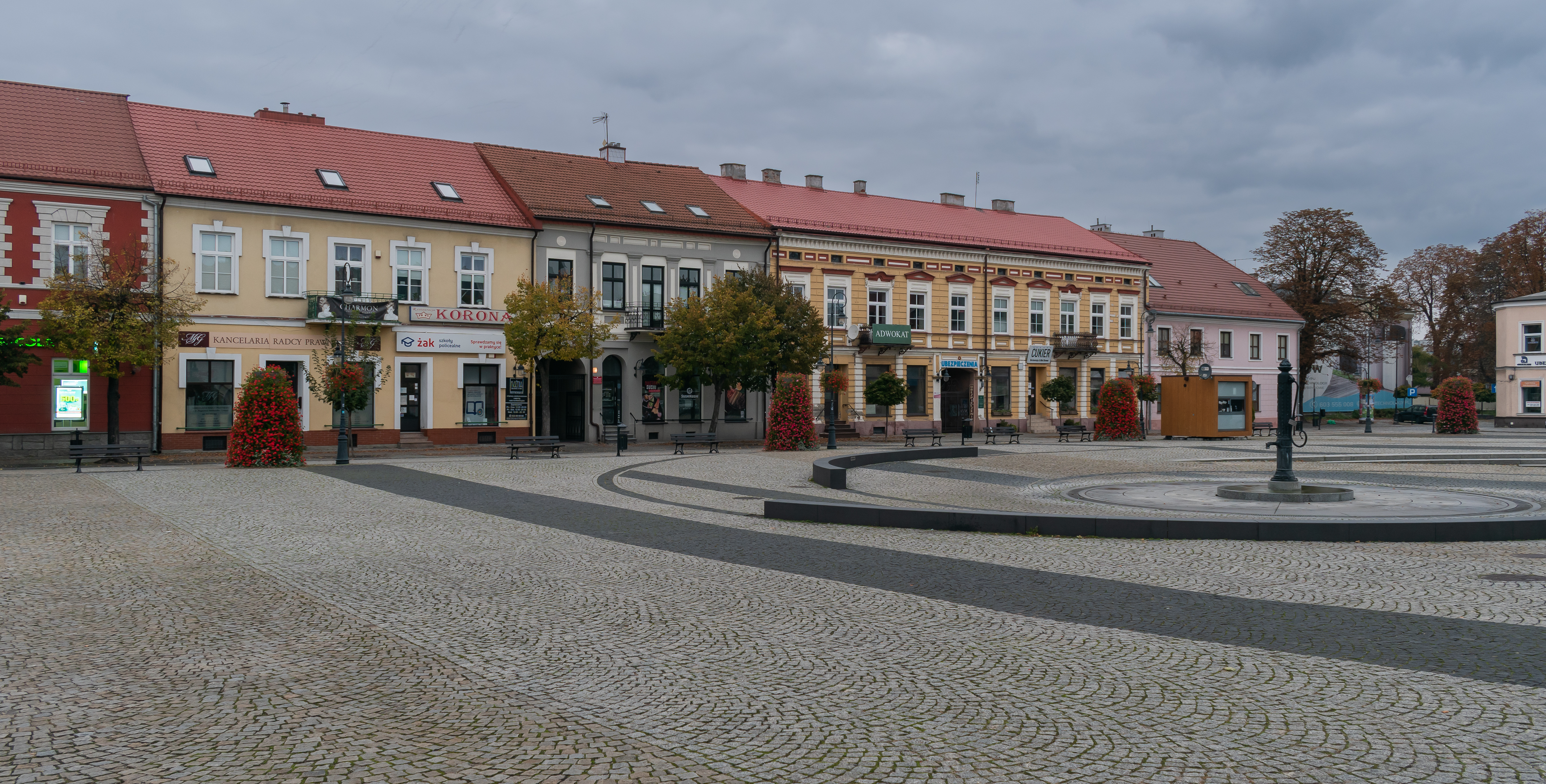
- Market Square in Piotrków Trybunalski Dobrzynka River in Pabianice Sulejów Abbey Castle in Uniejów Old Market Square in Sieradz

- Coat of arms

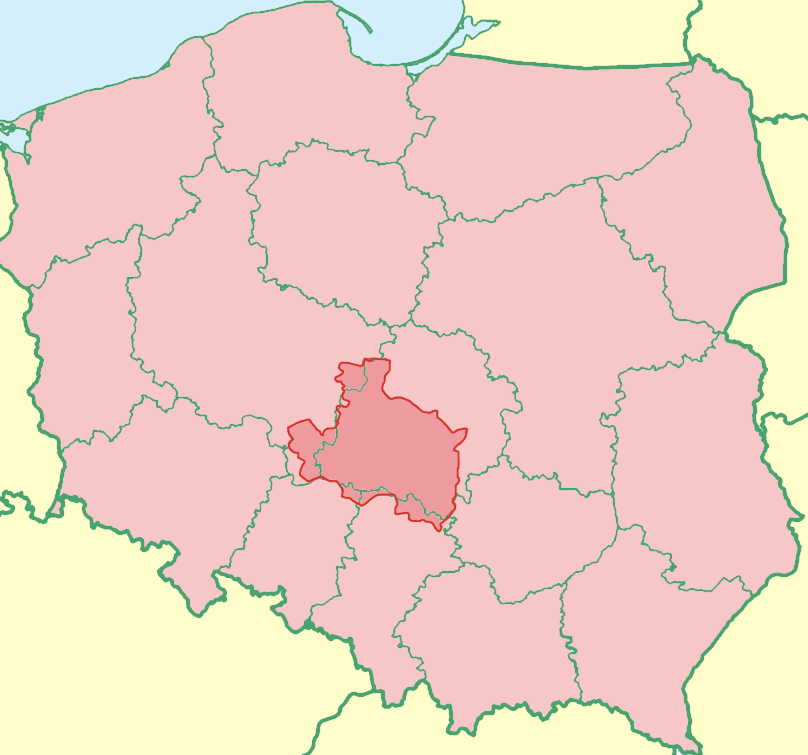
- Sieradz Land overlaid on an administrative map of Poland
- Country: Poland
- Capital: Sieradz
- Largest city: Piotrków Trybunalski
- Time zone: UTC+1 (CET)
  - Summer (DST): UTC+2 (CEST)

Sieradz Land (Polish: ziemia sieradzka; Latin: Terra Siradiae) is a historical region in central Poland, a part of Łęczyca-Sieradz Land (Polish: ziemia łęczycko-sieradzka).

Its traditional capital is Sieradz, while other bigger cities are Piotrków Trybunalski (another historically important locality), Radomsko, Tomaszów Mazowiecki (partly in Łęczyca Land), Bełchatów, Zduńska Wola, and Pabianice (a suburb of Łódź).

Sieradz Land is bordered by Greater Poland in the west, Łęczyca Land in the north-east, Lesser Poland in the south-east and in the south, and Wieluń Land in the south-west. It lies at the Warta, on the left bank of Pilica and on the south-west bank of Ner rivers. It spans an area of 9,700 km^{2} and has about 950,000 inhabitants.

The Łęczyca Land and Sieradz Land combined roughly correspond with present-day Łódź Voivodeship.

== History ==
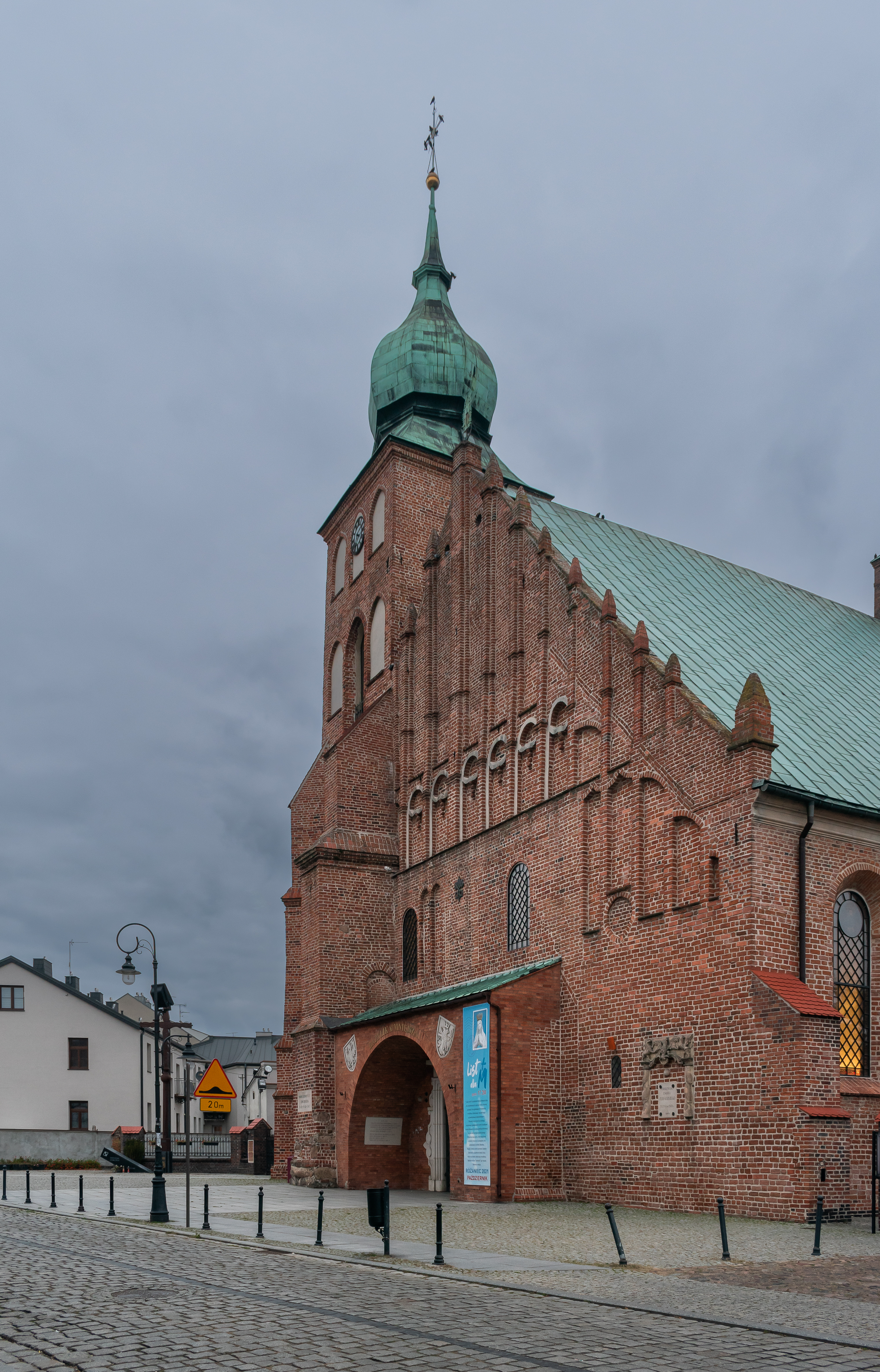
All Saints Collegiate Church in Sieradz

The territory formed part of Poland since the establishment of the state in the 10th century. In the High Middle Ages, the main center of the area was Sieradz, and among other oldest medieval towns were Lutomiersk, Piotrków, Przedbórz, Radomsko, Rozprza, Spycimierz, Sulejów, Szadek, Uniejów, Wolbórz. Sieradz Land has been the name of the administrative unit from 14th-18th centuries (former Duchy of Sieradz) of the same borders (and a little different from the Sieradz Voivodeship within the Greater Poland Province, which included furthermore smaller Wieluń Land); the sejmik used to be held in Szadek. The major city of Sieradz Land was Piotrków, which hosted several sessions of the Sejm of the Kingdom of Poland, and the Crown Tribunal for the Greater Poland Province. In term of ecclesiastical administration, Sieradz Land has been a part of the Archdiocese of Gniezno, and Uniejów used to be a residence of the Primate of Poland, with the residence castle preserved as a heritage monument.

In 1793 the region was annexed by the Kingdom of Prussia in the Second Partition of Poland. In 1807 it became part of the short-lived Polish Duchy of Warsaw, and in 1815 it passed to the Russian Partition of Poland. Polish resistance was active in the region, and multiple battles of the November Uprising and January Uprising were fought in the region. After Poland regained its independence, these lands were included in the Łódź and Kielce voivodeships.

On 1 September 1939, when Nazi Germany launched its invasion of Poland, nearby Wieluń was bombed and the area between the German border and the Warta River was occupied. During the invasion, German troops committed numerous massacres of Polish civilians in the region, including at Pławno, Kajetanowice, Uniejów, Wylazłów, Balin, Chechło, Dominikowice, Czekaj, and a massacre of Polish prisoners of war, including 19 officers, at Moryca and Longinówka (see Nazi crimes against the Polish nation). Eventually, these lands were partly in the General Government and partly directly annexed to Third German Reich, and administered as part of the province of Reichsgau Wartheland. The local Polish and Jewish populations were subjected to persecution. Sieradz was the location of one of the most important German prisons in Reichsgau Wartheland, with several more prisons subordinate to the main prison in Sieradz, located in Burzenin, Janiszewice, Niechmirów, Złoczew, and subcamps in Herbertów and Zelów. Its prisoners, predominantly Poles and Jews, were subjected to insults, beatings, forced labour, tortures and executions. Prisoners were given very low food rations, and meals were even prepared from rotten vegetables, spoiled fish and dead dogs. Many prisoners died of exhaustion, starvation or torture. After the war, Polish historian Antoni Galiński was able to identify 968 people who died or were shot in the prison and its subcamps in 1940–1945, however the overall number of deaths is certainly higher. In April 1940 and June 1941, the Germans murdered 581 patients of the psychiatric hospital in Warta as part of Aktion T4.

== Language ==
The Polish language of the inhabitants of the Sieradz Land (along with that of the Łęczyca Land) is considered the closest to the Polish literary language, as the region did not develop its own dialect, but was a place of blending of dialects from the neighboring larger regions of Greater Poland, Lesser Poland and Silesia.

== Cities and towns ==
- Bełchatów
- Błaszki
- Dobra
- Kamieńsk
- Koniecpol
- Lutomiersk
- Łask
- Pabianice
- Pajęczno
- Piotrków Trybunalski
- Radomsko
- Rozprza
- Rzgów
- Sieradz
- Sulejów
- Szadek
- Turek
- Tuszyn
- Uniejów
- Warta
- Wolbórz
- Zduńska Wola
- Zelów
- Złoczew

== Bibliography ==
- Koter, Marek (2016). "Historyczno-geograficzne podstawy oraz proces kształtowania się regionu łódzkiego". In Marszał, Tomasz (ed.). Miasto–region–gospodarka w badaniach geograficznych (in Polish). Łódź: Wydawnictwo Uniwersytetu Łódzkiego. ISBN 978-83-8088-004-7.
