= Łęg Baliński =

- Village
- Location within Poland
- Coordinates: 51°55′44″N 18°46′25″E
- Country: Poland
- Voivodeship: Łódź
- County: Poddębice
- Gmina: Uniejów

Łęg Baliński [ˈwɛnk baˈliɲski] is a village in the administrative district of Gmina Uniejów, within Poddębice County, Łódź Voivodeship, in central Poland.
