= Gmina Uniejów =

Gmina Uniejów Uniejów Municipality
- Gmina
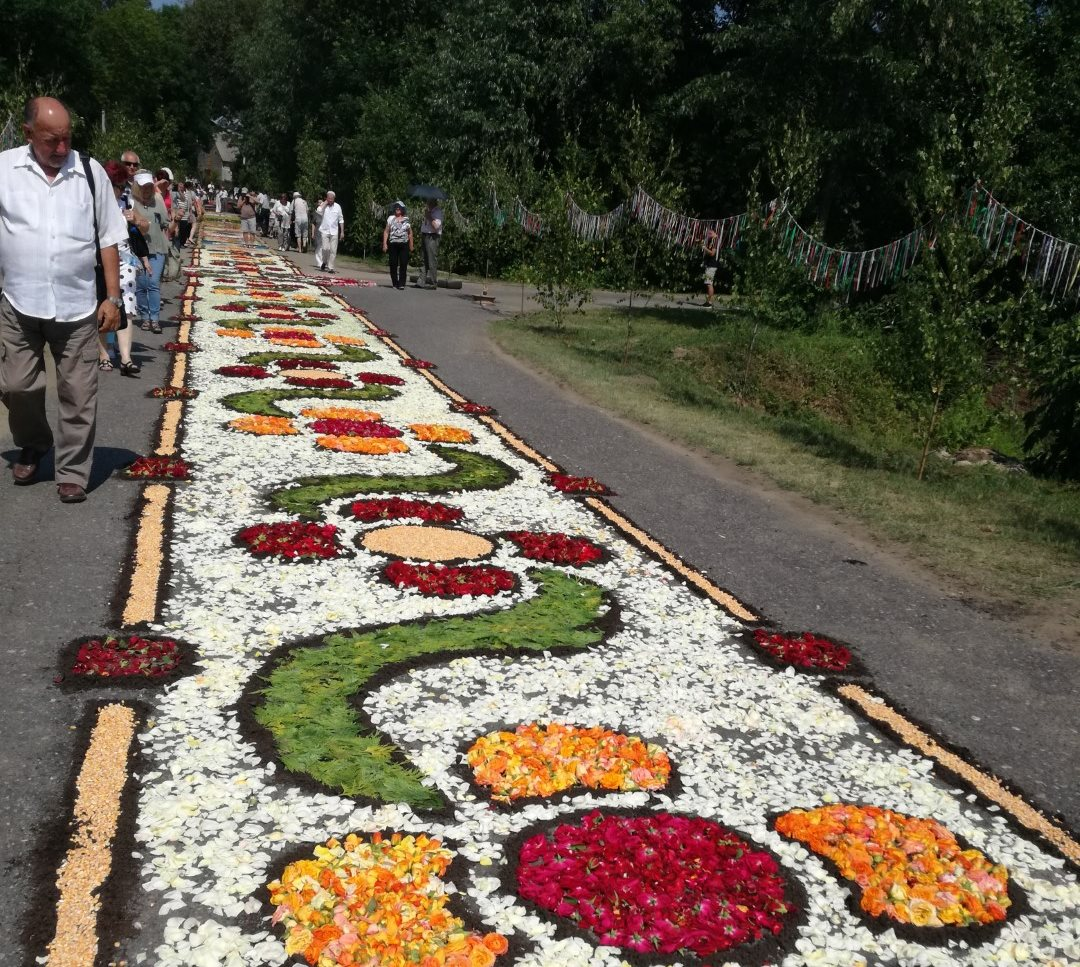

- Flag Coat of arms
- Interactive map of Gmina Uniejów
- Coordinates (Uniejów): 51°58′12″N 18°48′1″E
- Country: Poland
- Voivodeship: Łódź
- County: Poddębice
- Seat: Uniejów

Government
  - Mayor: Józef Kaczmarek

Area
  - Total: 129 km^{2} (50 sq mi)

Population (2017)
  - Total: 7,062
  - Density: 55/km^{2} (140/sq mi)
  - Urban: 3,011
  - Rural: 4,051
- Website: http://www.uniejow.pl

Gmina Uniejów is an urban-rural gmina (principal unit of the administrative division of Poland, similar to a municipality) in Poddębice County, Łódź Voivodeship, in central Poland. Its administrative centre and the seat of the local government is the town of Uniejów, which lies approximately 14 kilometres (9 mi) north-west of Poddębice and 51 km (32 mi) north-west of the regional capital Łódź.

The gmina covers an area of 129 square kilometres (49.8 sq mi), and as of 2017 its total population is 7,062 (out of which the population of the town of Uniejów amounts to 3,011, and the population of the rural part of the gmina is 4,051).

== Geothermal power ==
Uniejów Municipality is known for its innovative exploitation of geothermal water. The deposits of geothermal water were discovered at the end of the 1970s as part of research work on exploration for oil and natural gas. In the years 1990-1992 under the leading of scientists, among others from the AGH University of Science and Technology in Kraków two geothermal wells located about 1 kilometre from each other were drilled. They are still in use:

- PIG / AGH-1 is an absorbent borehole into which chilled water is pumped back into the ground. It was drilled in 1991 and its depth reaches 2065 m.
- PIG / AGH-2 is a production well from which water is extracted. It was made in 1990 and its depth is 2031 m.

In addition, Uniejów has an IGH-1 reserve well (with a depth of 2254 m). It was made in 1979 and is currently used in case of failure, repair or maintenance of core wells.

In Uniejów the cascade use of heat coming from geothermal water is applied. After extraction to the surface, it is directed to heat exchangers, where it heats fresh water. This, with the help of a pump, is pressed to heat residential, public, curative, recreational, hospitality and other buildings. After cooling to 50 degrees Celsius, geothermal water is directed to healing and swimming pools, where it is used for rehabilitation and recreation baths. Due to the fact that geothermal water is still warm, it has a temperature of about 35 degrees Celsius, in winter it is used to heat the football fields. The cooled water is directed to the borehole and injected into the aquifer, where it heats up again.

In 2008 the National Institute of Public Health -National Institute of Hygiene issued a certificate on the healing properties of water from the PIG / AGH-2 spring.

== Flower carpets in Spycimierz: UNESCO Intangible Cultural Heritage ==
For over 200 years the inhabitants of the small village of Spycimierz (2,5 kilometres from the town of Uniejów) have created flower carpets with a length of approximately one kilometre along the Corpus Christi procession route. The Feast of Corpus Christi (Body of Christ) is a Catholic liturgical solemnity celebrating annually 60 days after Easter. Besides the Holy Mass and processions, in several places of the world the custom of composing floral carpets developed. Spycimierz is one the places in Poland with a longstanding tradition for Corpus Christi, still active until today.

In 2018, Corpus Christi procession with the tradition of flower carpets in Spycimierz was entered into the National List of Intangible Cultural Heritage. The list published by the Minister of Culture and National Heritage in co-operation with the National Heritage Board of Poland, includes customs, traditions and ceremonies from Poland. In March 2020 Poland nominated Flower carpets tradition for Corpus Christi processions for inscription on the Representative List of the Intangible Cultural Heritage of Humanity maintained by the United Nations Educational, Scientific and Cultural Organization (UNESCO). The decision to inscribe it on the UNESCO list was taken on 15 December 2021 by the Intergovernmental Committee for the Safeguarding of Intangible Cultural Heritage.

The history of flower carpets in Spycimierz goes back to a hard to specify period. Although the oldest written account of this custom comes from the parish chronicle dating back to 1957, the oral communication is much older. For the oldest message one should acknowledge the legend of the appearance of this custom along with the return of soldiers from Napoleon to their native village. The residents of Spycimierz admit that this custom dates back to the interwar period or the beginning of the 20th century.

The manner of arranging flower carpets has changed and evolved over the years. Initially, yellow sand and twigs were used, so the old decor was rather plain. Flowers began to be used later on, and the current manner of decorating the route developed after 1945.

== Villages ==
Apart from the town of Uniejów, Gmina Uniejów contains the villages and settlements of Brzeziny, Brzozówka, Czekaj, Czepów, Człopy, Dąbrowa, Felicjanów, Góry, Hipolitów, Kozanki Wielkie, Kuczki, Łęg Baliński, Lekaszyn, Orzeszków, Orzeszków-Kolonia, Ostrowsko, Pęgów, Rożniatów, Rożniatów-Kolonia, Skotniki, Spycimierz, Spycimierz-Kolonia, Stanisławów, Wielenin, Wielenin-Kolonia, Wieścice, Wilamów, Wola Przedmiejska, Zaborów and Zieleń.

== Neighbouring gminas ==
Gmina Uniejów is bordered by the gminas of Brudzew, Dąbie, Dobra, Poddębice, Przykona, Świnice Warckie and Wartkowice.

== Twin towns – sister cities ==
Gmina Uniejów is twinned with:

- Mórahalom, Hungary
- Krāslava, Latvia
- Sonkajärvi, Finland
- Truskavets, Ukraine
- (Georgia (country)) Racha-Lechkhumi and Kvemo Svaneti, Georgia
- (Georgia (country)) Tsqaltubo, Georgia
- Horki, Belarus
- Naftalan, Azerbaijan
- Alatri, Italy
- Grindavík, Iceland
- Turek, Poland
- Szczyrk, Poland

== Gallery ==
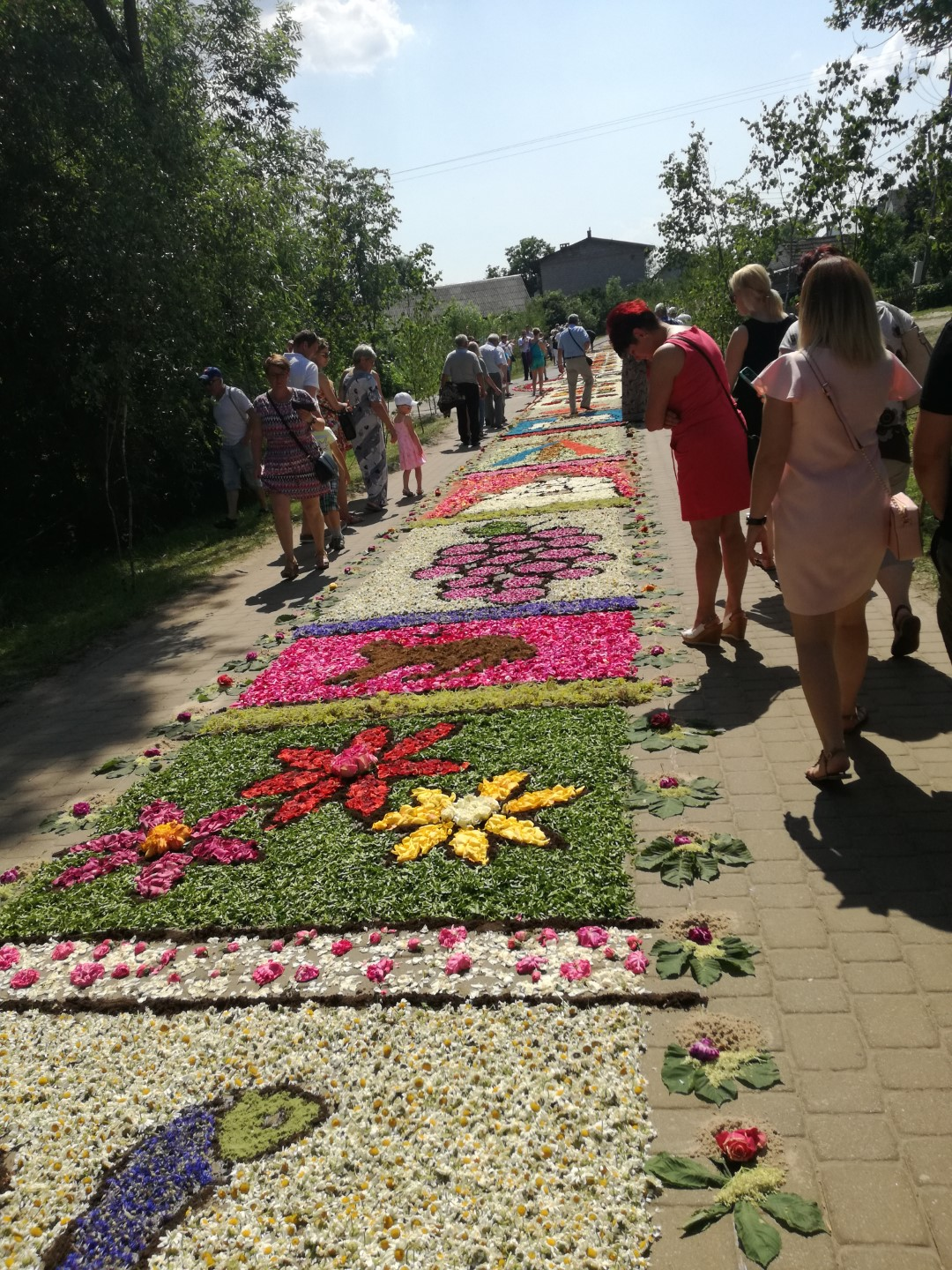
Flower carpets along Corpus Christi procession route in Spycimierz

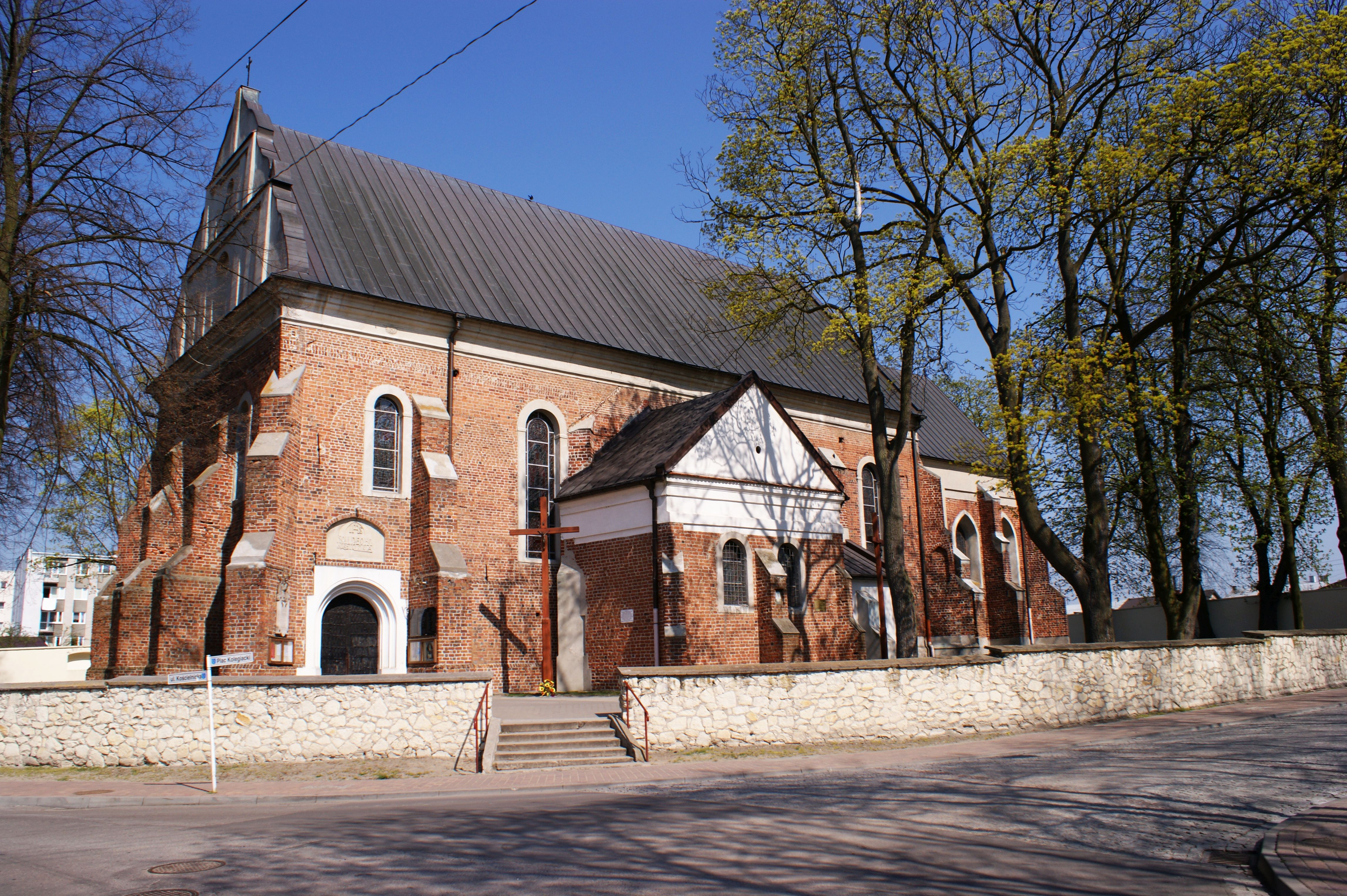
14th-century Collegiate church in Uniejów

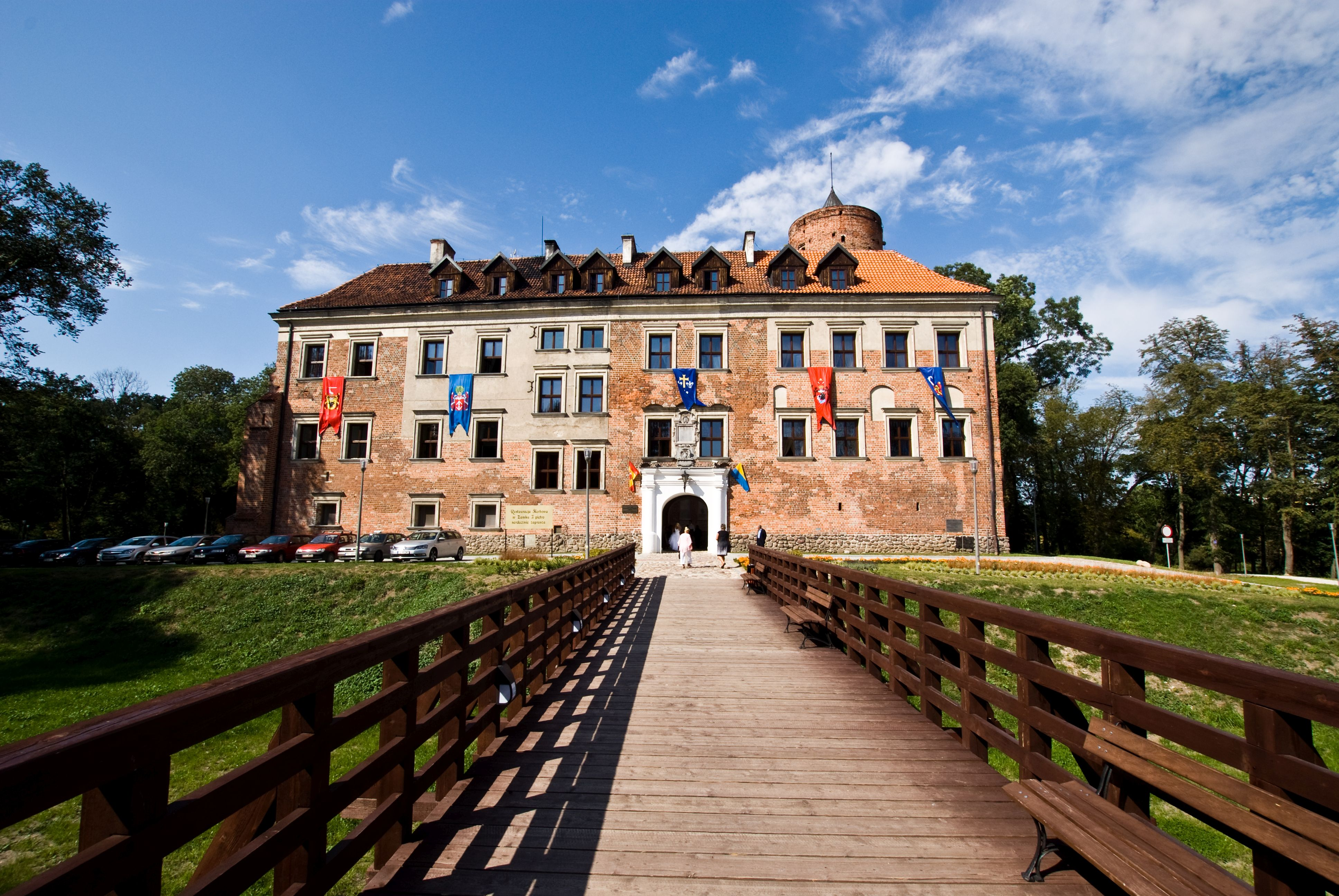
14th century Castle of the Archbishops of Gniezno in Uniejów

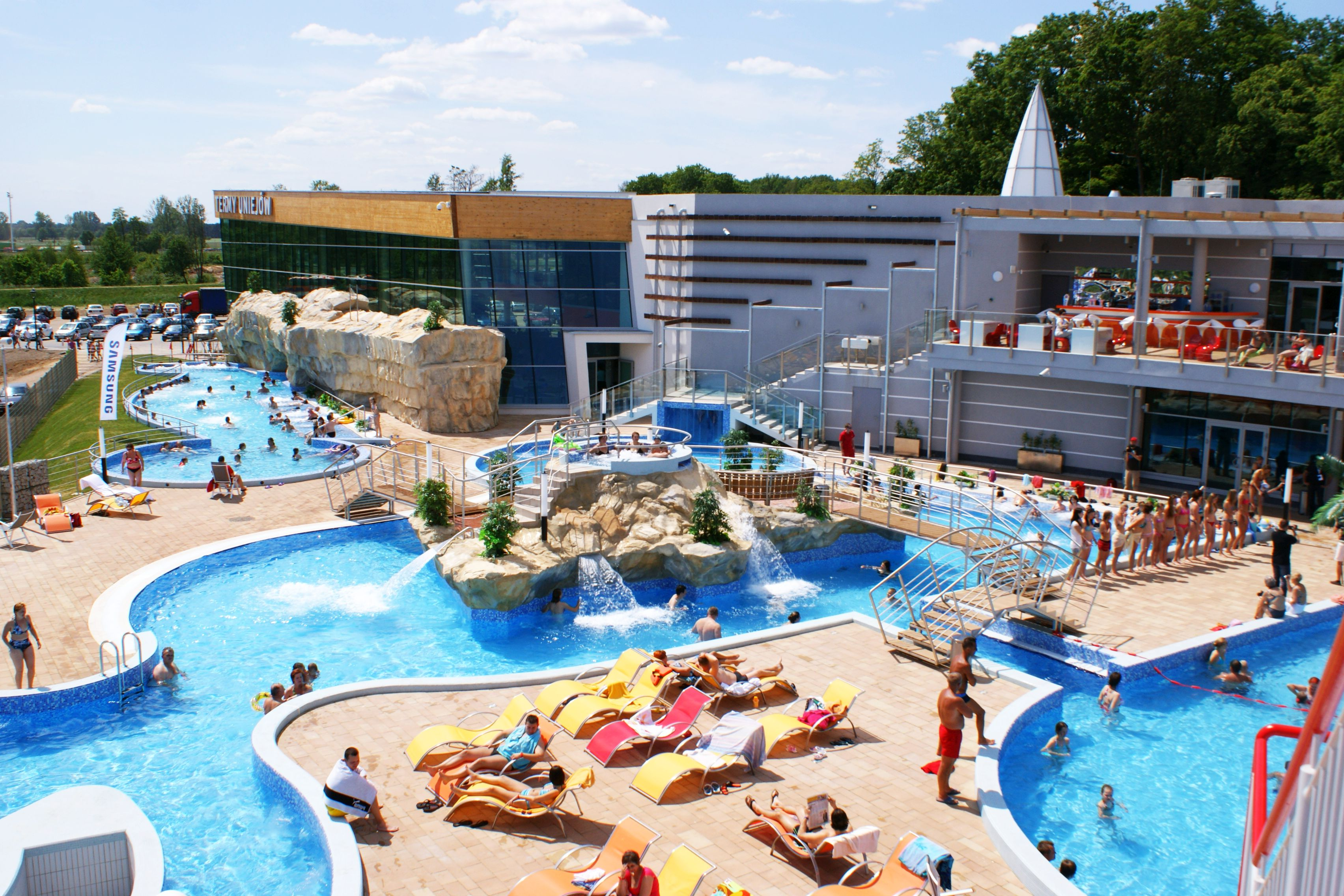
Uniejów Thermal Park
