= Czepów =

- Village
- Location within Poland
- Coordinates: 52°3′N 18°47′E
- Country: Poland
- Voivodeship: Łódź
- County: Poddębice
- Gmina: Uniejów

Czepów [ˈt͡ʂɛpuf] is a village in the administrative district of Gmina Uniejów, within Poddębice County, Łódź Voivodeship, in central Poland.
