= Warta, Poland =

Town in Łódź Voivodeship, Poland

Warta
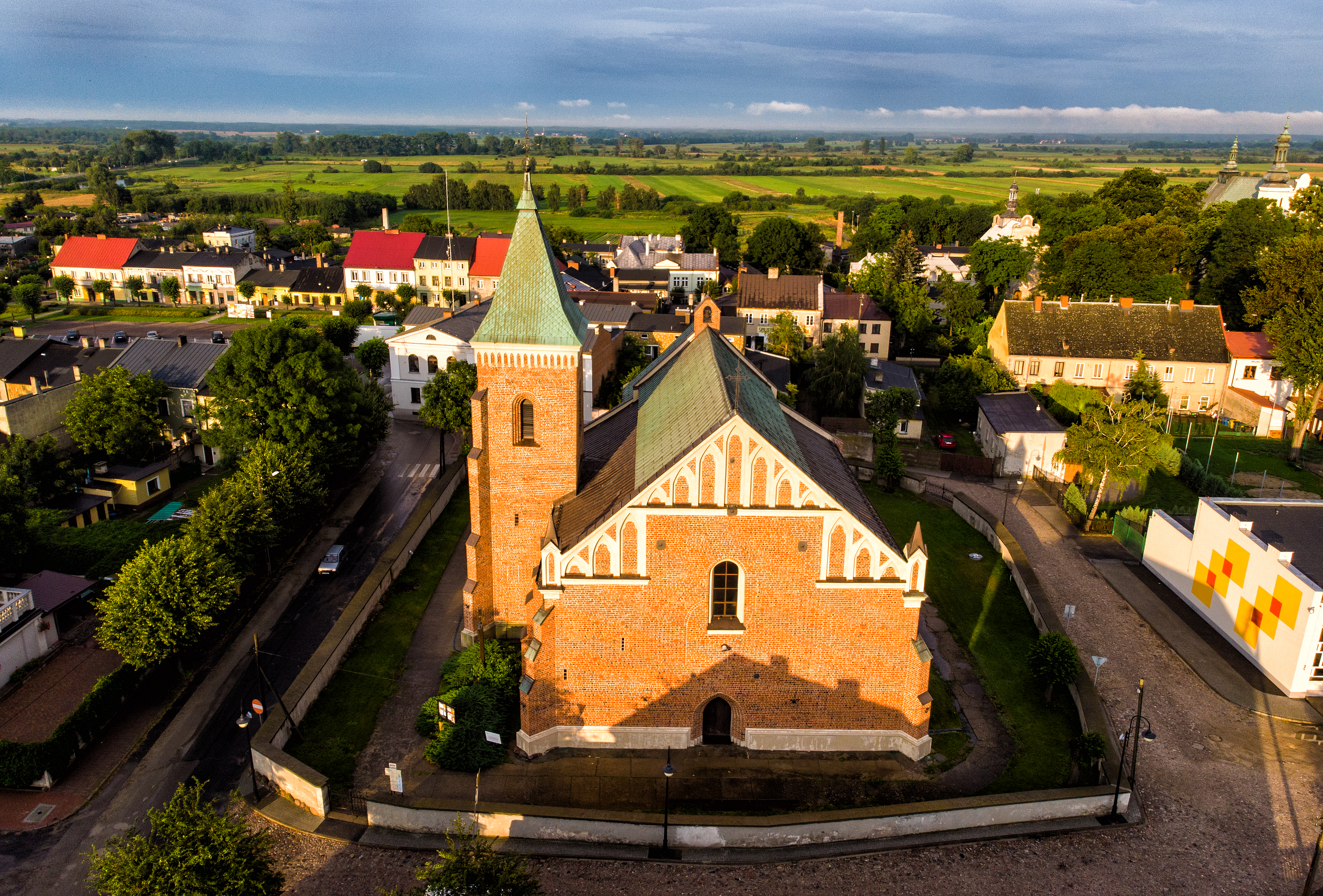
- Gothic St. Nicholas Church

- Flag Coat of arms

- Location within Poland
- Coordinates: 51°42′N 18°38′E
- Country: Poland
- Voivodeship: Łódź
- County: Sieradz
- Gmina: Warta
- Town rights: 1255

Government
  - Mayor: Krystian Krogulecki

Area
  - Total: 10.84 km^{2} (4.19 sq mi)

Population (31 December 2020)
  - Total: 3,208 ▼
  - Density: 295.9/km^{2} (766.5/sq mi)
- Time zone: UTC+1 (CET)
  - Summer (DST): UTC+2 (CEST)
- Postal code: 98-290
- Vehicle registration: ESI
- Website: http://www.gimwarta.pl

Warta (Polish: [ˈvarta]; Yiddish: דווארט, romanized: Dvart) is a town in Sieradz County, Łódź Voivodeship, in central Poland, with 3,208 inhabitants (2020). It is situated on the Warta River. It is located in the Sieradz Land.

== History ==
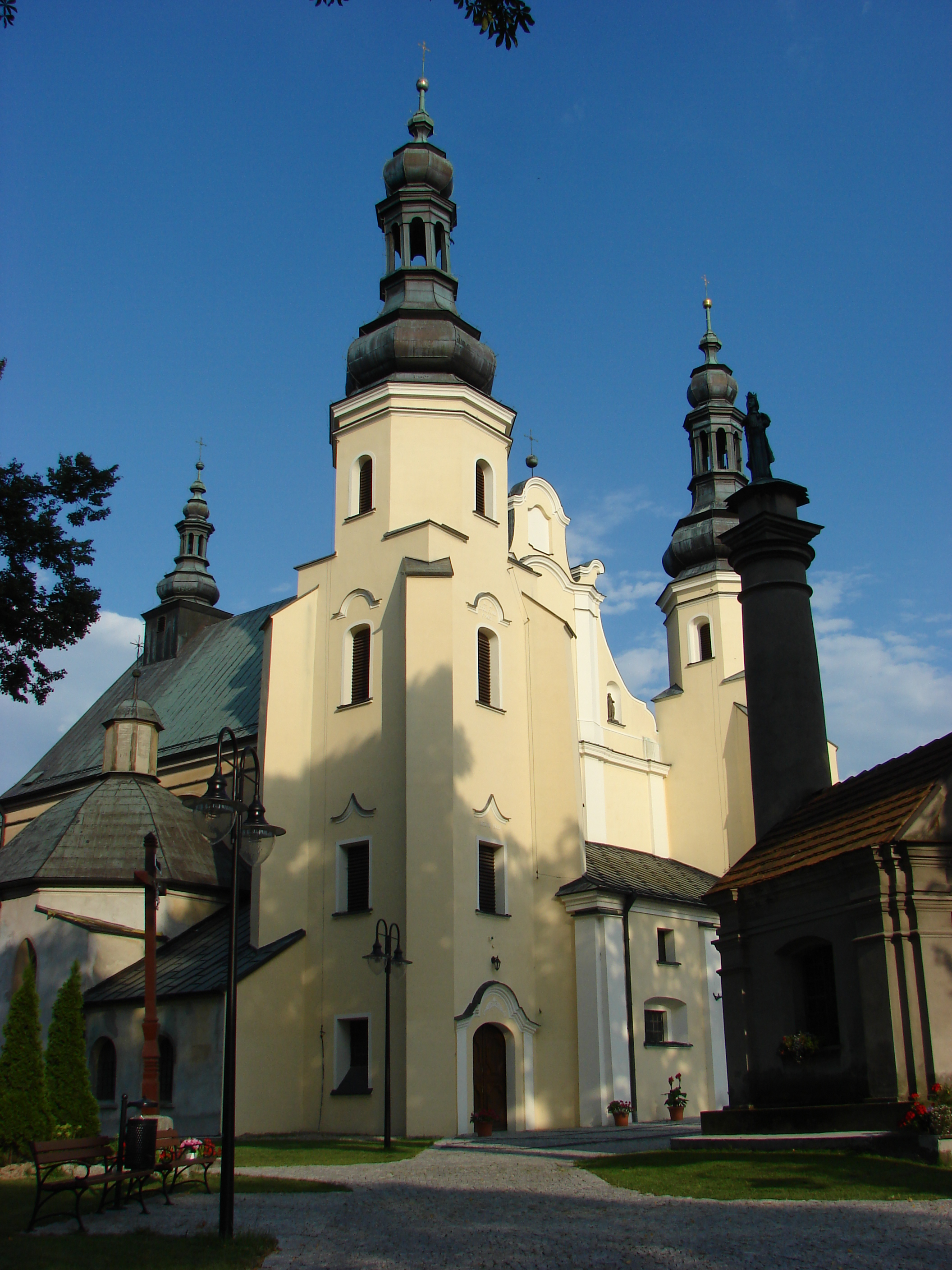
Church of the Assumption of Virgin Mary, built in the 15th century, rebuilt in the years 1696-1708

Warta was granted town rights in 1255 by Duke Casimir I of Kuyavia of the Piast dynasty. It was a royal town of the Polish Crown, administratively located in the Sieradz County in the Sieradz Voivodeship in the Greater Poland Province. In the 17th century, there was a sizeable Scottish community in Warta. One of two main routes connecting Warsaw and Dresden ran through the town in the 18th century and Kings Augustus II the Strong and Augustus III of Poland often traveled that route. At various times, the 2nd Polish National Cavalry Brigade and 4th Polish Vanguard Regiment were stationed in Warta.

In the interwar period, it was administratively located in the Łódź Voivodeship of Poland. In the 1921 census, 56.8% of the population declared Polish nationality and 43.0% declared Jewish nationality.

When the Germans invaded Poland at the start of World War II in September 1939, they immediately brutalized the population. Some Poles from Warta were murdered by the Wehrmacht already on September 7, 1939 in the nearby village of Wylazłów. During the German occupation, Jews were kidnapped for forced labor, robbed of their possessions, and in early 1940, forced into a ghetto, leaving behind their furniture and other possessions for locals and Germans to take. In April 1940, the Germans murdered 499 patients of the local psychiatric hospital as part of Aktion T4. The next 82 patients were murdered by in June 1941. In both cases, patients were gassed in a gas van. In spring 1942, several Jews, including the rabbi, were hanged, allegedly for sending bread to Jews who had been sent to forced labor camps. In August 1942, all Jews were rounded up and held in a church for three days with nothing to eat. Some died from hunger and thirst, others were shot there. Afterwards, around 1,000 were sent to the Chełmno extermination camp where they were immediately gassed. Another few hundred were sent to the Łódź Ghetto. The number of pre-war Warta Jewish survivors is unclear; at least 50 and perhaps close to 200. More than 40 registered there after the war, but two by the names of Moshe Szajniak and Meir Rozewald were killed by Eugeniusz "Groźny" Kokolski and his group of militant anti-communists (now regarded among Poland's "Cursed Soldiers") who raided the town after the war ended, and the others left the town.

== Demographics ==
Historical population

Year	Pop.	±%
1897	3,418	—
1921	4,108	+20.2%
1931	4,360	+6.1%
1939	4,435	+1.7%

Year	Pop.	±%
1950	3,331	−24.9%
1960	3,679	+10.4%
2010	3,357	−8.8%

== Transport ==
Warta lies on national road 83. National road 83 connects Warta to Turek to the north and to Sieradz to the south.

Vovoideship road 710 passes through the town.

The nearest railway station is in Sieradz.

== Gallery ==
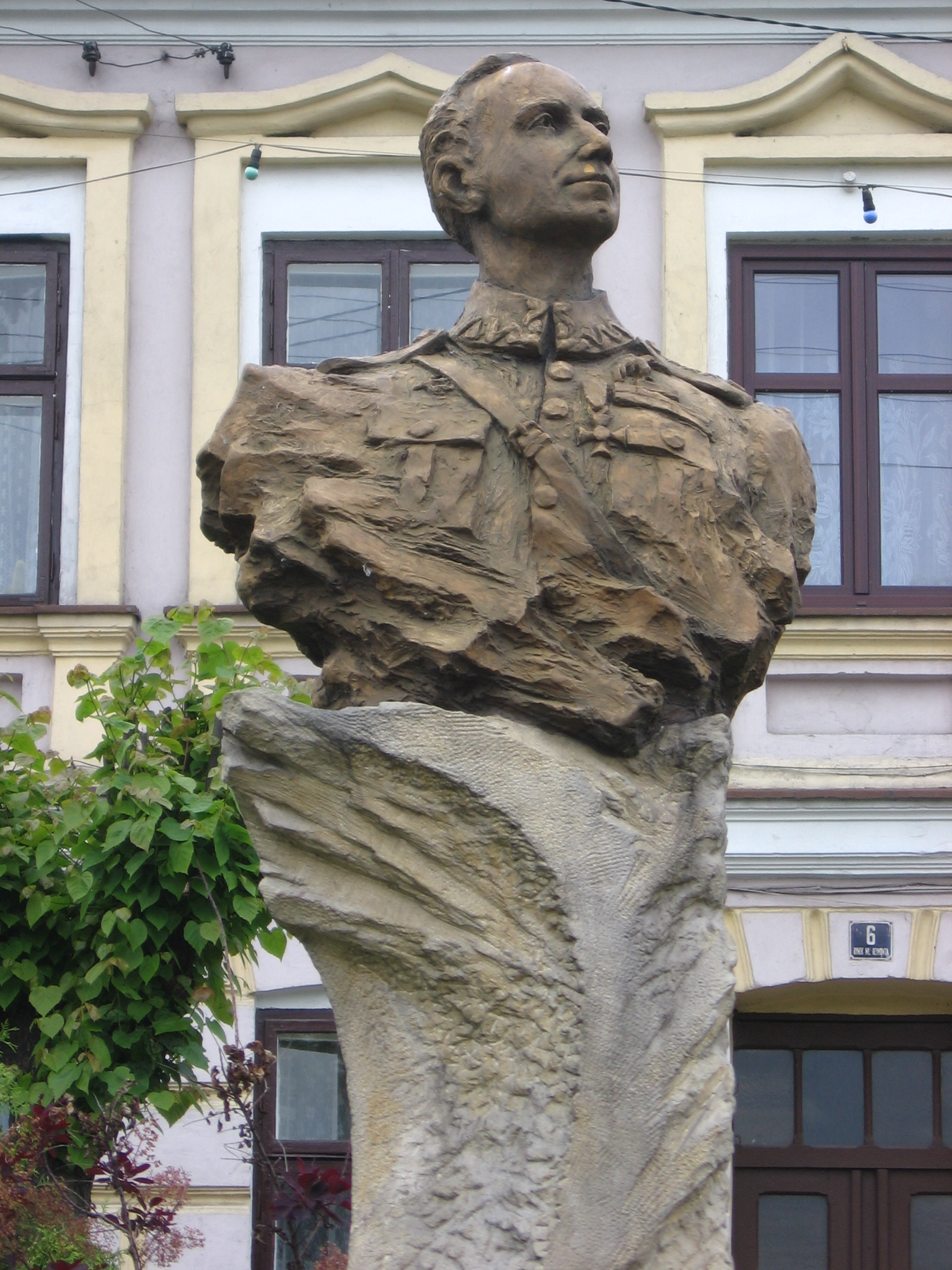
Statue of Stanisław Skarżyński in his hometown, Warta

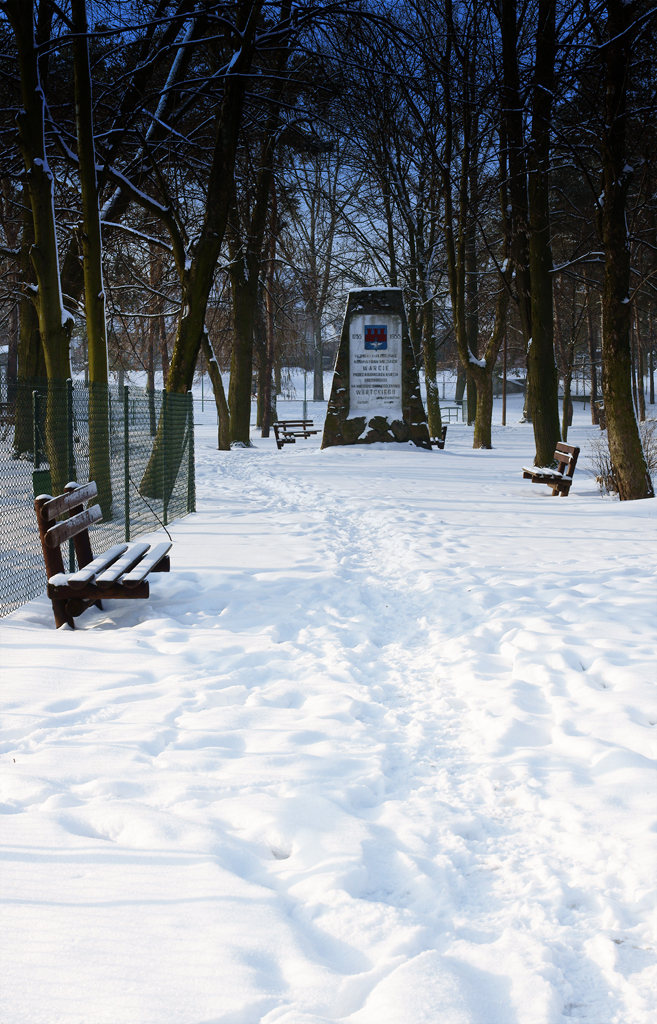
Park in Warta

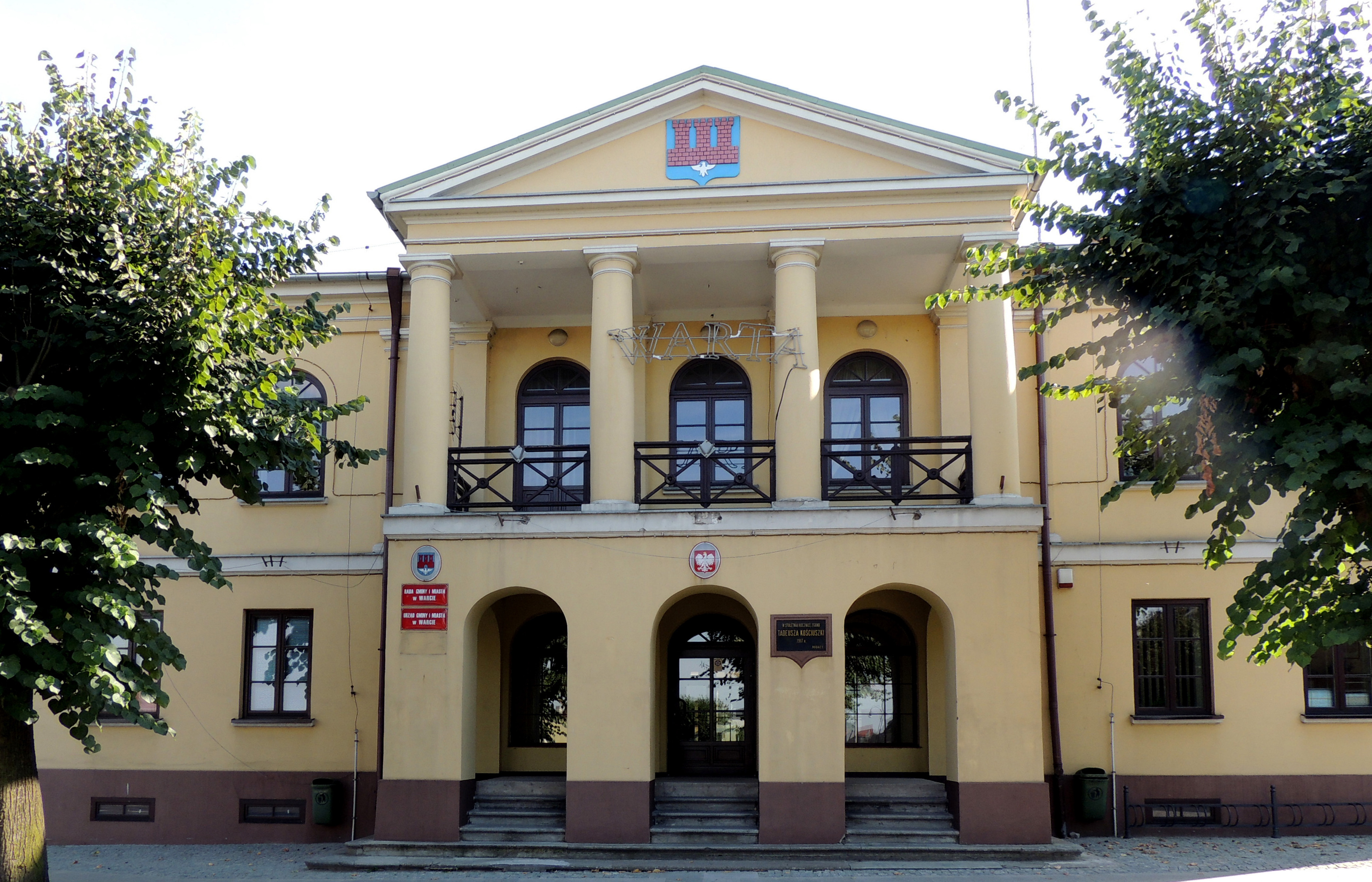
Town hall
