= Wola Przedmiejska =

- Village
- Location within Poland
- Coordinates: 51°58′N 18°50′E
- Country: Poland
- Voivodeship: Łódź
- County: Poddębice
- Gmina: Uniejów

Wola Przedmiejska [ˈvɔla pʂɛdˈmjɛi̯ska] is a village in the administrative district of Gmina Uniejów, within Poddębice County, Łódź Voivodeship, in central Poland.
