= Kozanki Wielkie =

- Village
- Location within Poland
- Coordinates: 52°2′19″N 18°52′41″E
- Country: Poland
- Voivodeship: Łódź
- County: Poddębice
- Gmina: Uniejów

Kozanki Wielkie [kɔˈzanki ˈvjɛlkʲɛ] is a village in the administrative district of Gmina Uniejów, within Poddębice County, Łódź Voivodeship, in central Poland.
