= Skotniki, Poddębice County =

Skotniki
- Village
- Location within Poland
- Coordinates: 52°1′33″N 18°46′18″E
- Country: Poland
- Voivodeship: Łódź
- County: Poddębice
- Gmina: Uniejów

Skotniki [skɔtˈniki] is a village in the administrative district of Gmina Uniejów, within Poddębice County, Łódź Voivodeship, in central Poland.
