= Brzeziny, Poddębice County =

Brzeziny
- Village
- Location within Poland
- Coordinates: 51°59′48″N 18°48′36″E
- Country: Poland
- Voivodeship: Łódź
- County: Poddębice
- Gmina: Uniejów
- Population: 120

Brzeziny [bʐɛˈʑinɨ] is a village in the administrative district of Gmina Uniejów, within Poddębice County, Łódź Voivodeship, in central Poland.
