= Zaborów, Gmina Uniejów =

Zaborów
- Village
- Location within Poland
- Coordinates: 52°2′4″N 18°51′11″E
- Country: Poland
- Voivodeship: Łódź
- County: Poddębice
- Gmina: Uniejów

Zaborów [zaˈbɔruf] is a village in the administrative district of Gmina Uniejów, within Poddębice County, Łódź Voivodeship, in central Poland.
