= Felicjanów, Poddębice County =

Felicjanów
- Village
- Location within Poland
- Coordinates: 51°59′25″N 18°50′8″E
- Country: Poland
- Voivodeship: Łódź
- County: Poddębice
- Gmina: Uniejów

Felicjanów [fɛlit͡sˈjanuf] is a village in the administrative district of Gmina Uniejów, within Poddębice County, Łódź Voivodeship, in central Poland.
