= Stanisławów, Poddębice County =

Stanisławów
- Village
- Location within Poland
- Coordinates: 52°1′22″N 18°48′35″E
- Country: Poland
- Voivodeship: Łódź
- County: Poddębice
- Gmina: Uniejów
- Population: 260

Stanisławów [staniˈswavuf] is a village in the administrative district of Gmina Uniejów, within Poddębice County, Łódź Voivodeship, in central Poland.
