= Góry, Poddębice County =

Góry
- Village
- Location within Poland
- Coordinates: 52°1′43″N 18°44′21″E
- Country: Poland
- Voivodeship: Łódź
- County: Poddębice
- Gmina: Uniejów

Góry [ˈɡurɨ] is a village in the administrative district of Gmina Uniejów, within Poddębice County, Łódź Voivodeship, in central Poland.
