= Spycimierz =

- Village
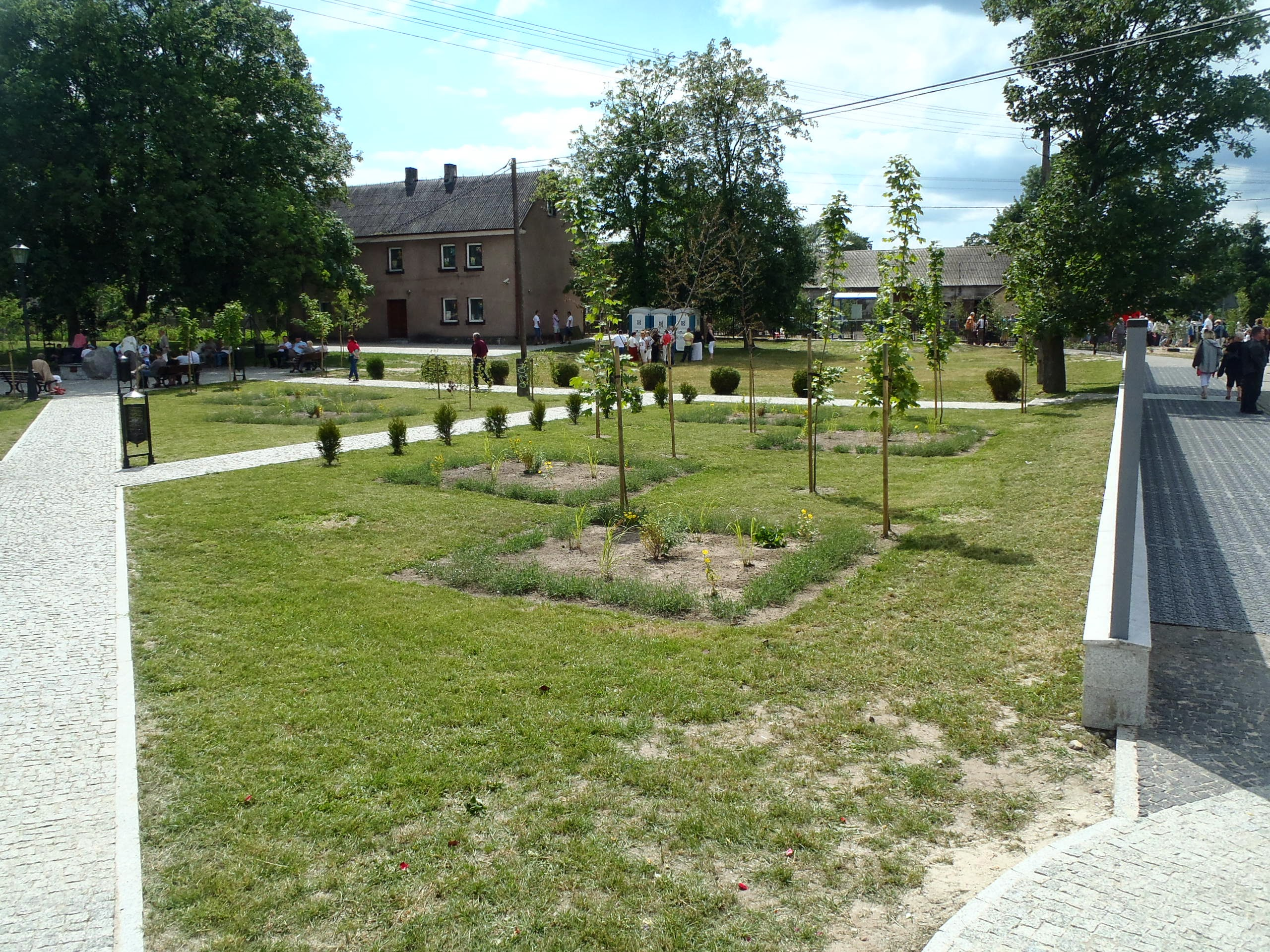

- Location within Poland
- Coordinates: 51°57′N 18°46′E
- Country: Poland
- Voivodeship: Łódź
- County: Poddębice
- Gmina: Uniejów

Population
  - Total: 380
- Time zone: UTC+1 (CET)
  - Summer (DST): UTC+2 (CEST)
- Vehicle registration: EPD

Spycimierz [spɨˈt͡ɕimjɛʂ] is a village in the administrative district of Gmina Uniejów, within Poddębice County, Łódź Voivodeship, in central Poland. The village is known for celebration of the Corpus Christi feast when the inhabitants create flower carpets along the 2 km (1 mi) long route of the procession.

It is part of historic Sieradz Land.

== History ==
The name of the village comes from a given name Spycimir, also spelled Spycimierz in Polish. The village was first mentioned as Spicimir in the chronicle of Gallus Anonymus, written in 1112–1116. Gallus wrote that it was attacked in a Pomeranian raid in 1108.

In the Middle Ages, a fortified gord existed in the location of the present village. Spycimierz was located at the junction of two important trails, from Pomerania to Rus, and from Łęczyca to Kalisz. The gord was ring-shaped, with wood and earth fortification, topped by a wooden palisade. Here, Duke Bolesław III the Wrymouth imprisoned Archbishop Martin in ca. 1106. Spycimierz was regarded as a ducal property, mentioned in 1136 in a bull of Pope Innocent II.

The gord was the seat of a castellan, and remained one until the early 14th century. The Spicymierz Castellany belonged to the Duchy of Sieradz, and was located along right bank of the Warta river. Some time before 1331, in unknown circumstances, the gord became private property of a local nobleman, Pawel Ogonczyk.

Spycimierz was burned to the ground in 1331, when a unit of Teutonic Knights crossed the Warta, and set the gord on fire. A wooden castle was built in the location of the former gord, but Spycimierz lost its importance to the adjacent town of Uniejów. The gord is still visible. It lies on a meadow, near the Warta river Oxbow lake.

== Flower carpets for Corpus Christi procession ==
Spycimierz is best known for the flower carpets that members of the local parish have been arranging for the Corpus Christi procession for decades. In 2018, the tradition was entered into the National List of Intangible Cultural Heritage. In March 2020 Poland nominated Flower carpets tradition for Corpus Christi processions in Spycimierz and four parishes in southern Poland (Klucz, Olszowa, Zalesie Ślaskie, Zimna Wódka) for inscription on the Representative List of the Intangible Cultural Heritage of Humanity maintained by the United Nations Educational, Scientific and Cultural Organization (UNESCO). On 15 November 2021, a UNESCO Evaluation Body issued a document containing the examination of nominations for inscription on the Representative List of the Intangible Cultural Heritage of Humanity in 2021. The Evaluation Body recommended that the Flower carpets tradition for Corpus Christi processions be inscribed on the Representative List of the Intangible Cultural Heritage of Humanity. The final decision on the inscription was taken on 15 December 2021 by the Intergovernmental Committee for the Safeguarding of Intangible Cultural Heritage.

The history of flower carpets in Spycimierz goes back to a hard to specify period. Although the oldest written account of this custom comes from the parish chronicle dating back to 1957, oral communication is much older. For the oldest message, one should acknowledge the legend of the appearance of this custom along with the return of soldiers from Napoleon to their native village. The composition of the flower carpets has changed and evolved over the years. At first, yellow sand and twigs were used, so the old decoration was modest. Later, flowers began to be used, and the current way of dressing the route took shape after 1945. The colorful carpet of live flowers is laid by parishioners along the Corpus Christi road, which is about 1 kilometre long. A solemn procession passes over it at 5 p.m.

== Gallery ==
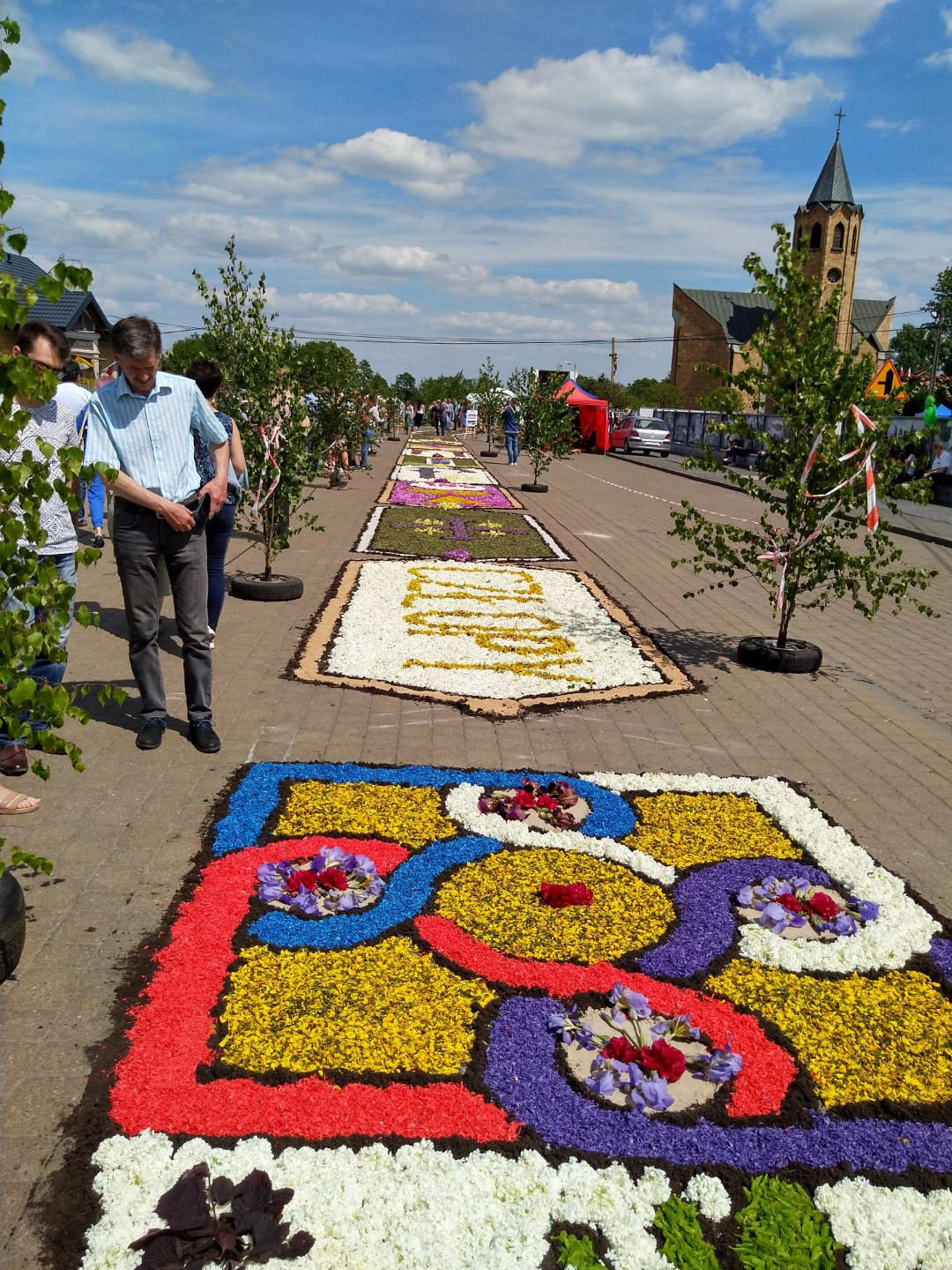
The main square on the day of Corpus Christi, June 2021

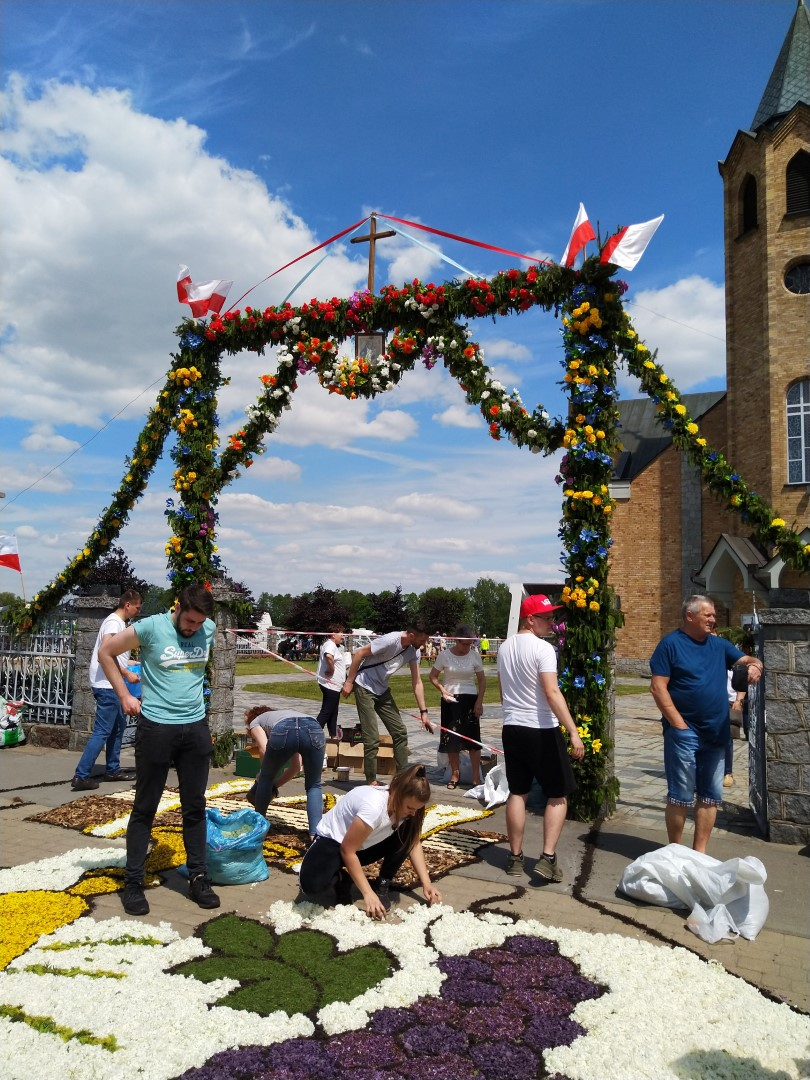
Gate and a fragment of a carpet at the entrance to the church, June 2021

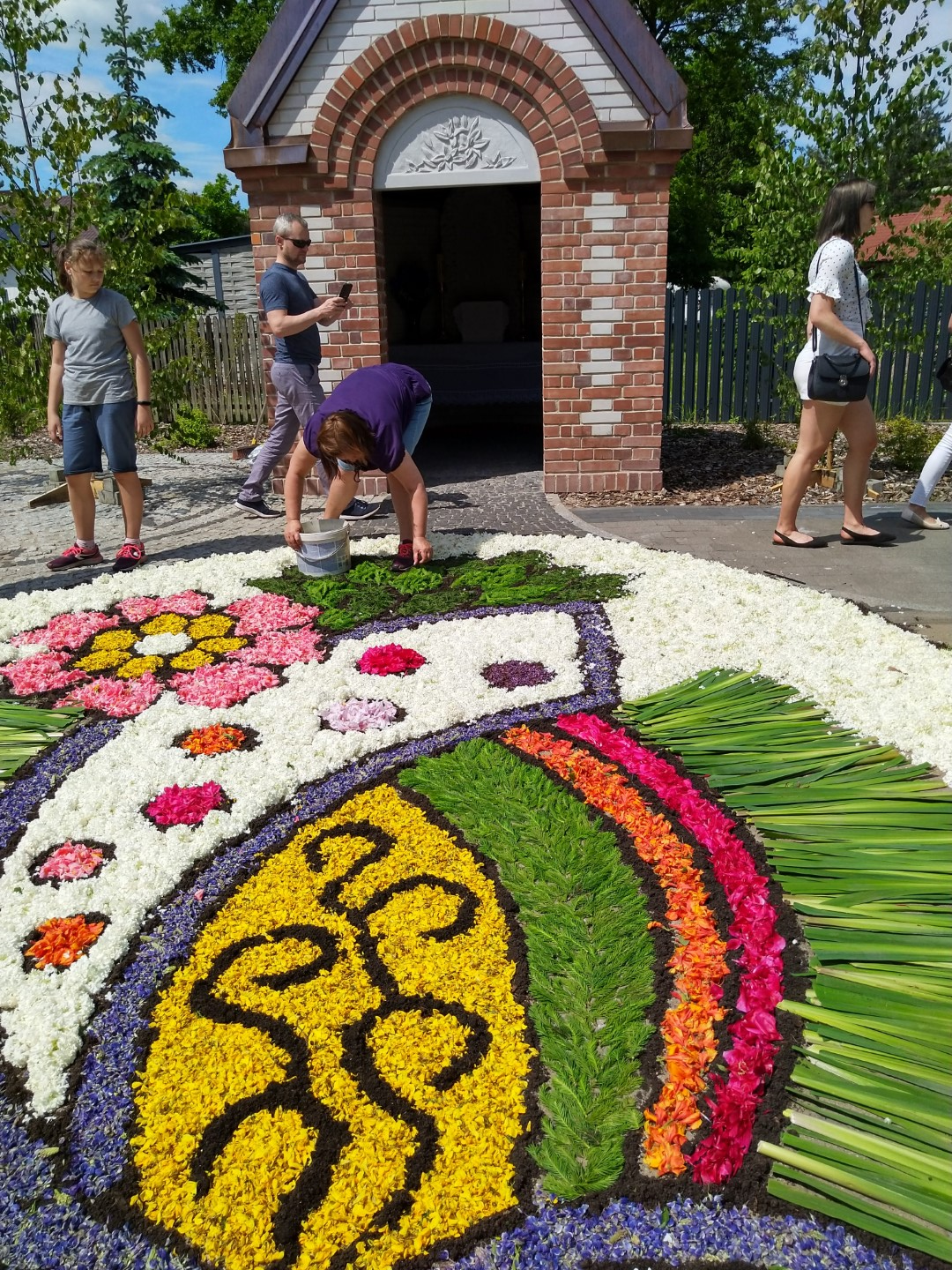
A fragment of the flower carpet, June 2021

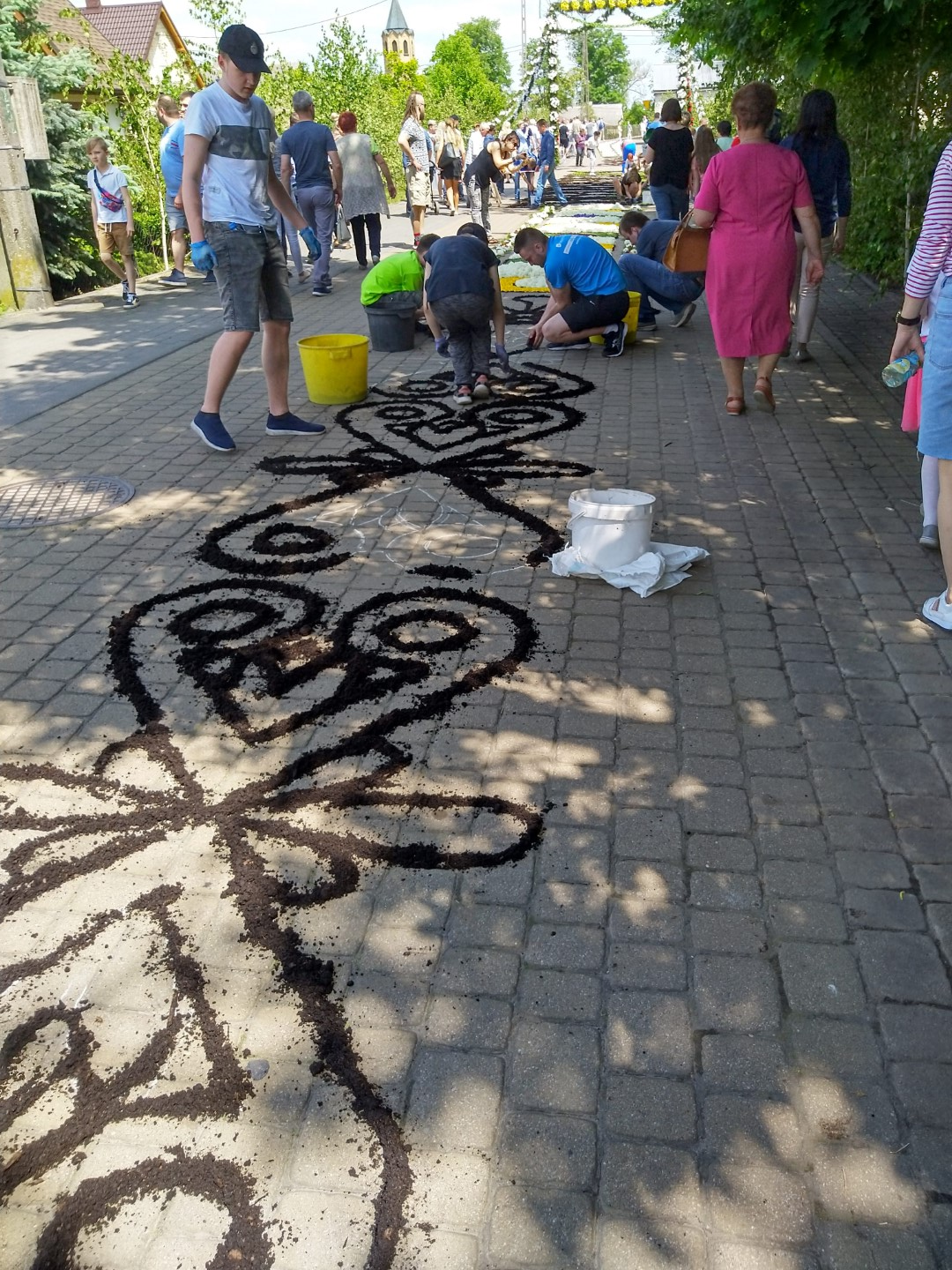
Patterns used to arrange flower carpets, June 2021

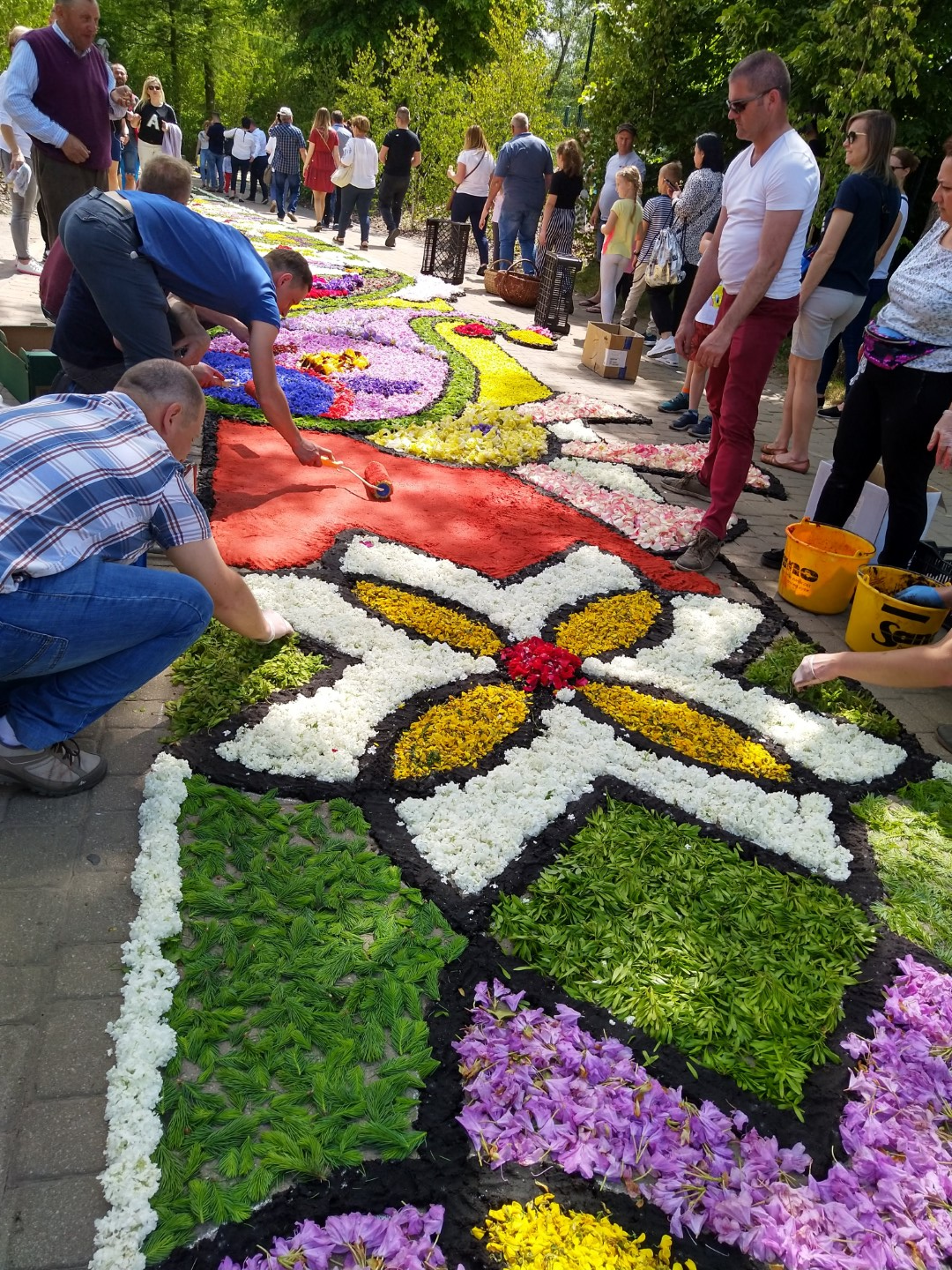
Parishioners during carpet arranging, June 2021

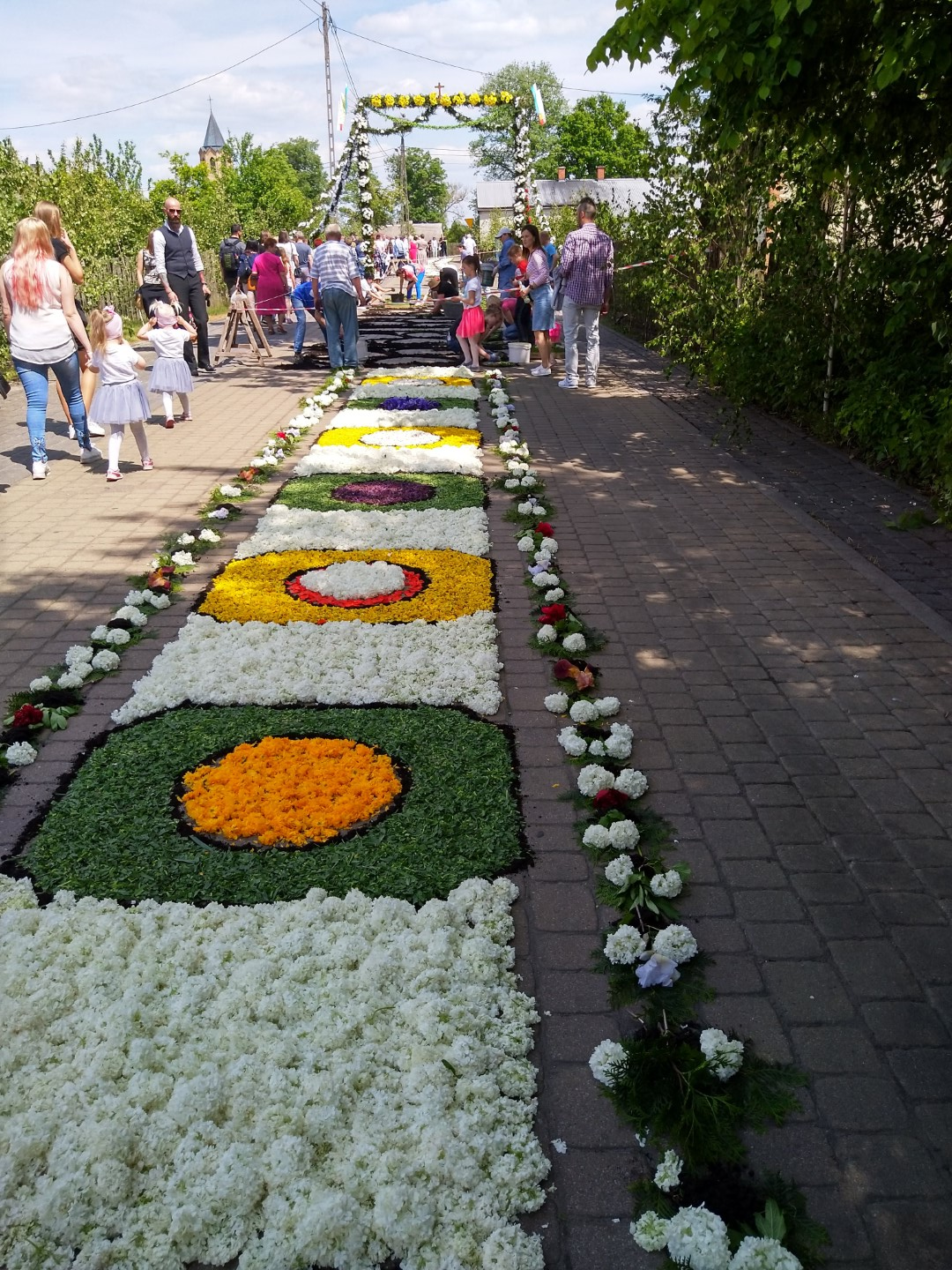
A floral carpet and one of two gates at the back, June 2021

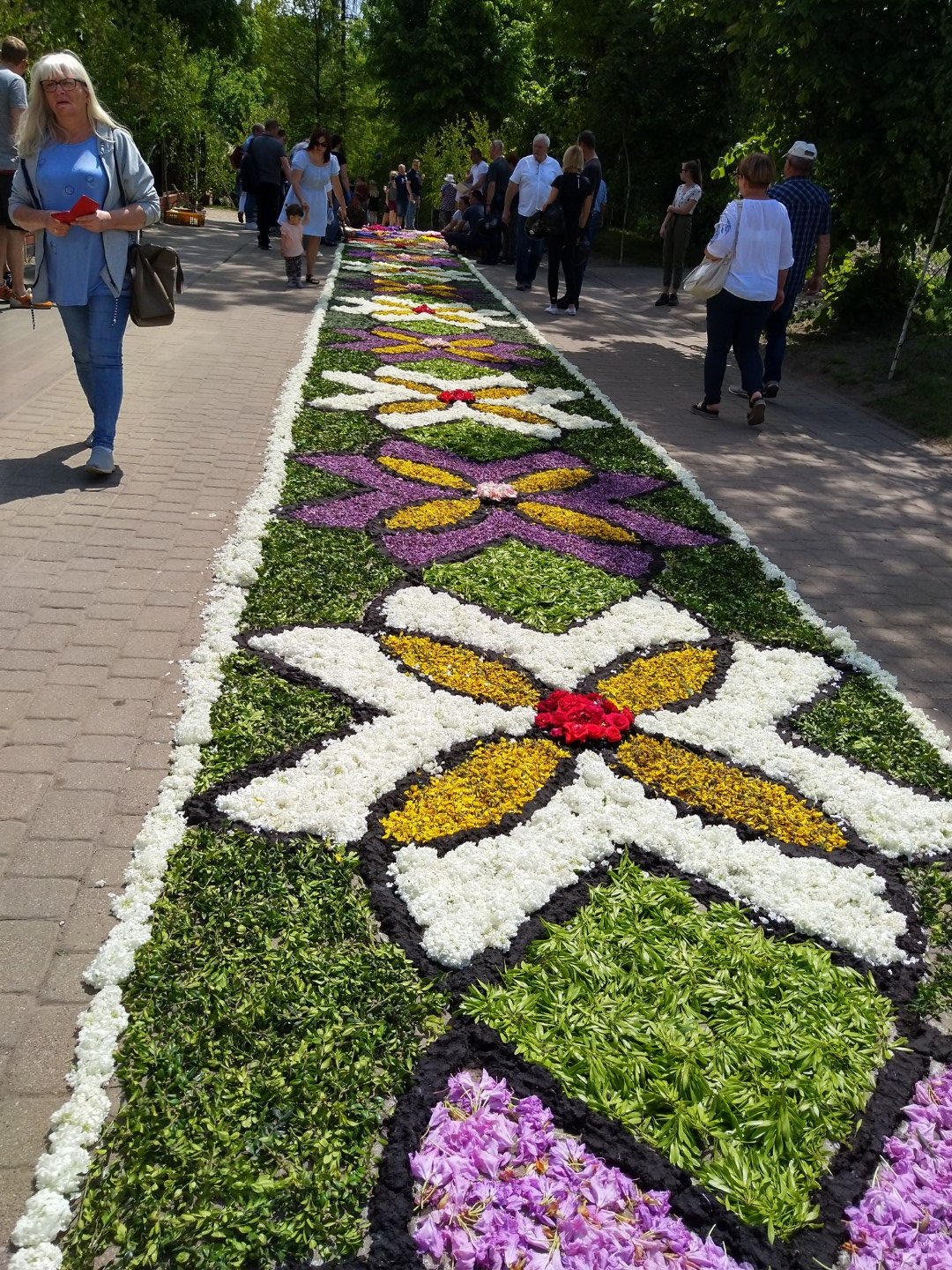
Beautiful carpet with live flowers, June 2021
