= Dąbrowa, Poddębice County =

Dąbrowa
- Village
- Location within Poland
- Coordinates: 52°1′59″N 18°49′47″E
- Country: Poland
- Voivodeship: Łódź
- County: Poddębice
- Gmina: Uniejów

Dąbrowa [dɔmˈbrɔva] is a village in the administrative district of Gmina Uniejów, within Poddębice County, Łódź Voivodeship, in central Poland.
