= Kuczki =

- Village
- Location within Poland
- Coordinates: 52°0′55″N 18°44′48″E
- Country: Poland
- Voivodeship: Łódź
- County: Poddębice
- Gmina: Uniejów
- Population: 183

Kuczki [ˈkut͡ʂki] is a village in the administrative district of Gmina Uniejów, within Poddębice County, Łódź Voivodeship, in central Poland.
