= Wielenin-Kolonia =

- Village
- Location within Poland
- Coordinates: 52°1′13″N 18°49′43″E
- Country: Poland
- Voivodeship: Łódź
- County: Poddębice
- Gmina: Uniejów

Wielenin-Kolonia [vjɛˈlɛnin kɔˈlɔɲa] is a village in the administrative district of Gmina Uniejów, within Poddębice County, Łódź Voivodeship, in central Poland.
