= Orzeszków-Kolonia =

- Village
- Location within Poland
- Coordinates: 52°0′12″N 18°47′42″E
- Country: Poland
- Voivodeship: Łódź
- County: Poddębice
- Gmina: Uniejów
- Population: 135

Orzeszków-Kolonia [ɔˈʐɛʂkuf kɔˈlɔɲa] is a village in the administrative district of Gmina Uniejów, within Poddębice County, Łódź Voivodeship, in central Poland.
