= Hipolitów, Poddębice County =

Hipolitów
- Village
- Location within Poland
- Coordinates: 51°59′29″N 18°52′2″E
- Country: Poland
- Voivodeship: Łódź
- County: Poddębice
- Gmina: Uniejów
- Population: 70

Hipolitów [xipɔˈlituf] is a village in the administrative district of Gmina Uniejów, within Poddębice County, Łódź Voivodeship, in central Poland.
