= Ostrowsko, Łódź Voivodeship =

Ostrowsko
- Village
- Location within Poland
- Coordinates: 51°59′50″N 18°45′39″E
- Country: Poland
- Voivodeship: Łódź
- County: Poddębice
- Gmina: Uniejów
- Population: 400

Ostrowsko [ɔsˈtrɔfskɔ] is a village in the administrative district of Gmina Uniejów, within Poddębice County, Łódź Voivodeship, in central Poland.
