= Lekaszyn =

- Village
- Location within Poland
- Coordinates: 52°3′58″N 18°44′31″E
- Country: Poland
- Voivodeship: Łódź
- County: Poddębice
- Gmina: Uniejów
- Population: 180

Lekaszyn [lɛˈkaʂɨn] is a village in the administrative district of Gmina Uniejów, within Poddębice County, Łódź Voivodeship, in central Poland.
