= Wilamów, Poddębice County =

Wilamów
- Village
- Location within Poland
- Coordinates: 52°2′47″N 18°45′25″E
- Country: Poland
- Voivodeship: Łódź
- County: Poddębice
- Gmina: Uniejów
- Population: 440

Wilamów [viˈlamuf] is a village in the administrative district of Gmina Uniejów, within Poddębice County, Łódź Voivodeship, in central Poland.
