= Wieścice =

- Village
- Location within Poland
- Coordinates: 51°59′38″N 18°44′19″E
- Country: Poland
- Voivodeship: Łódź
- County: Poddębice
- Gmina: Uniejów

Wieścice [vjɛɕˈt͡ɕit͡sɛ] is a village in the administrative district of Gmina Uniejów, within Poddębice County, Łódź Voivodeship, in central Poland.
