= Zieleń, Łódź Voivodeship =

Zieleń
- Village
- Location within Poland
- Coordinates: 51°57′N 18°46′E
- Country: Poland
- Voivodeship: Łódź
- County: Poddębice
- Gmina: Uniejów
- Population: 100

Zieleń [ˈʑɛlɛɲ] is a village in the administrative district of Gmina Uniejów, within Poddębice County, Łódź Voivodeship, in central Poland.
