= Czekaj, Łódź Voivodeship =

Czekaj
- Village
- Location within Poland
- Coordinates: 51°58′57″N 18°49′47″E
- Country: Poland
- Voivodeship: Łódź
- County: Poddębice
- Gmina: Uniejów
- Time zone: UTC+1 (CET)
  - Summer (DST): UTC+2 (CEST)
- Vehicle registration: EPD

Czekaj [ˈt͡ʂɛkai̯] is a village in the administrative district of Gmina Uniejów, within Poddębice County, Łódź Voivodeship, in central Poland.

== History ==
During the German invasion of Poland at the start of World War II, on 8 September 1939, German troops carried out a massacre of 13 Polish farmers (see Nazi crimes against the Polish nation).
