= Człopy =

- Village
- Location within Poland
- Coordinates: 51°58′N 18°45′E
- Country: Poland
- Voivodeship: Łódź
- County: Poddębice
- Gmina: Uniejów
- Population: 250

Człopy [ˈt͡ʂwɔpɨ] is a village in the administrative district of Gmina Uniejów, within Poddębice County, Łódź Voivodeship, in central Poland.
