= Pęgów, Łódź Voivodeship =

Pęgów
- Village
- Location within Poland
- Coordinates: 52°1′35″N 18°52′14″E
- Country: Poland
- Voivodeship: Łódź
- County: Poddębice
- Gmina: Uniejów

Pęgów [ˈpɛŋɡuf] is a village in the administrative district of Gmina Uniejów, within Poddębice County, Łódź Voivodeship, in central Poland.
