= Orzeszków, Gmina Uniejów =

Orzeszków
- Village
- Location within Poland
- Coordinates: 52°1′19″N 18°47′36″E
- Country: Poland
- Voivodeship: Łódź
- County: Poddębice
- Gmina: Uniejów
- Population: 99

Orzeszków [ɔˈʐɛʂkuf] is a village in the administrative district of Gmina Uniejów, within Poddębice County, Łódź Voivodeship, in central Poland.
