= Rożniatów, Łódź Voivodeship =

Rożniatów
- Village
- Location within Poland
- Coordinates: 52°2′46″N 18°50′4″E
- Country: Poland
- Voivodeship: Łódź
- County: Poddębice
- Gmina: Uniejów

Rożniatów [rɔʐˈɲatuf] is a village in the administrative district of Gmina Uniejów, within Poddębice County, Łódź Voivodeship, in central Poland.
