= Spycimierz-Kolonia =

- Village
- Location within Poland
- Coordinates: 51°56′38″N 18°45′12″E
- Country: Poland
- Voivodeship: Łódź
- County: Poddębice
- Gmina: Uniejów

Spycimierz-Kolonia [spɨˈt͡ɕimjɛʂ kɔˈlɔɲa] is a village in the administrative district of Gmina Uniejów, within Poddębice County, Łódź Voivodeship, in central Poland.
