= Wylazłów, Gmina Pęczniew =

Village in Łódź Voivodeship, Poland

Wylazłów
- Village
- Location within Poland
- Coordinates: 51°48′58″N 18°42′51″E
- Country: Poland
- Voivodeship: Łódź
- County: Poddębice
- Gmina: Pęczniew
- Time zone: UTC+1 (CET)
  - Summer (DST): UTC+2 (CEST)
- Postal code: 99-235
- Vehicle registration: EPD

Wylazłów [vɨˈlazwuf] is a village in the administrative district of Gmina Pęczniew, within Poddębice County, Łódź Voivodeship, in central Poland.

== History ==
In the late 19th century Wylazłów had a population of 165.

Following the joint German-Soviet invasion of Poland, which started World War II in September 1939, the village was occupied by Germany until 1945. In October 1940, the German gendarmerie carried out expulsions of Poles, who were deported to the Lublin District in the more-eastern part of German-occupied Poland, while their farms were handed over to German colonists as part of the Lebensraum policy.
