= Alfonsów, Poddębice County =

Alfonsów
- Village
- Location within Poland
- Coordinates: 51°48′20″N 18°48′40″E
- Country: Poland
- Voivodeship: Łódź
- County: Poddębice
- Gmina: Zadzim
- Population: 28

Alfonsów [alˈfɔnsuf] is a village in the administrative district of Gmina Zadzim, within Poddębice County, Łódź Voivodeship, in central Poland.
