= Brodnia =

- Village
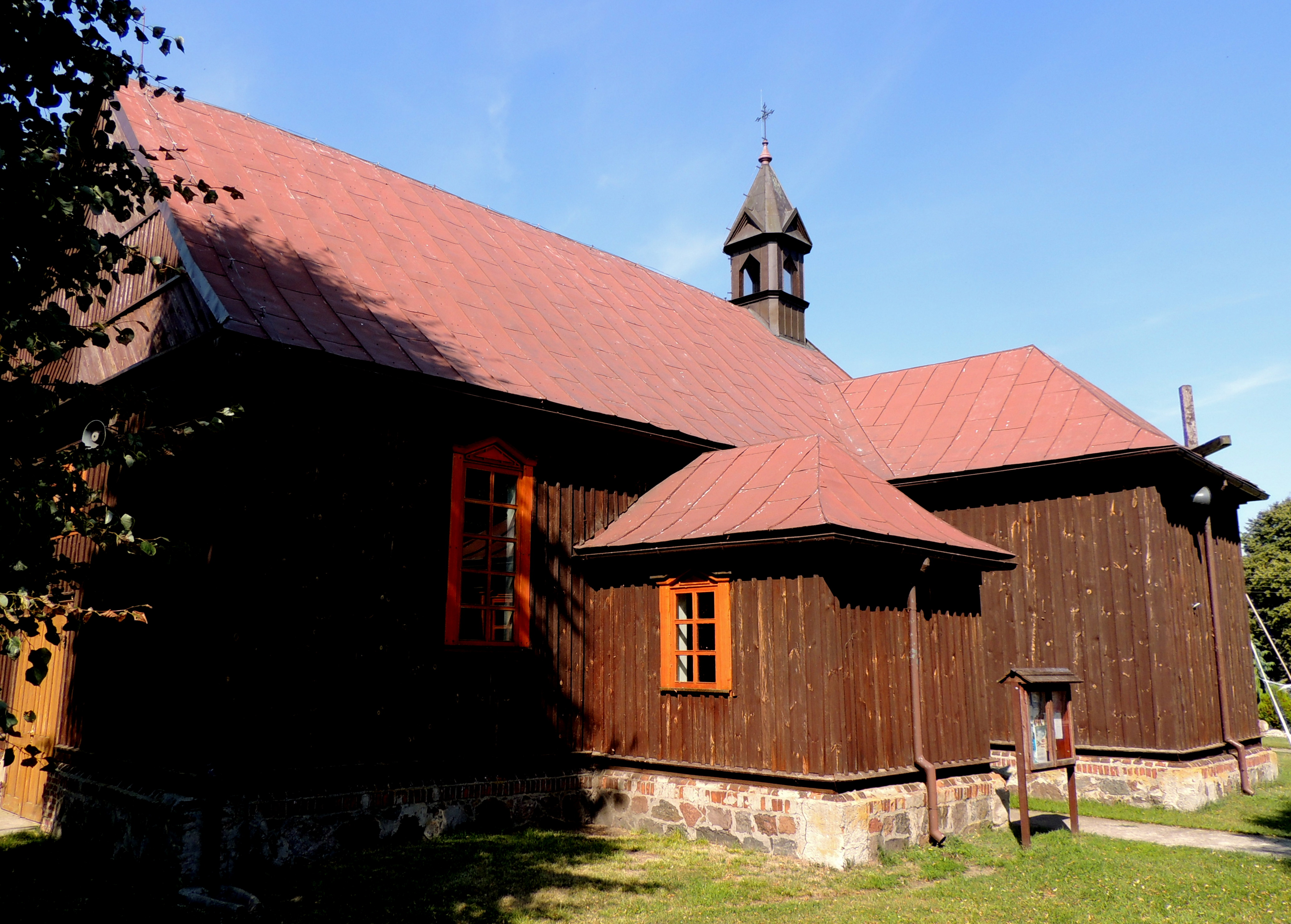
- Church in Brodnia

- Location within Poland
- Coordinates: 51°47′19″N 18°41′17″E
- Country: Poland
- Voivodeship: Łódź
- County: Poddębice
- Gmina: Pęczniew

Brodnia [ˈbrɔdɲa] is a village in the administrative district of Gmina Pęczniew, within Poddębice County, Łódź Voivodeship, in central Poland.
