= Dzierzązna Szlachecka =

- Village
- Location within Poland
- Coordinates: 51°48′N 18°59′E
- Country: Poland
- Voivodeship: Łódź
- County: Poddębice
- Gmina: Zadzim

Dzierzązna Szlachecka [d͡ʑɛˈʐɔ̃zna ʂlaˈxɛt͡ska] is a village in the administrative district of Gmina Zadzim, within Poddębice County, Łódź Voivodeship, in central Poland.
