= Krzemieniew =

- Village
- Location within Poland
- Coordinates: 51°53′41″N 19°4′8″E
- Country: Poland
- Voivodeship: Łódź
- County: Poddębice
- Gmina: Dalików
- Website: www.krzemieniew.cba.pl

Krzemieniew [kʂɛˈmjɛɲɛf] is a village in the administrative district of Gmina Dalików, within Poddębice County, Łódź Voivodeship, in central Poland.
