= Wierzchy, Poddębice County =

Wierzchy
- Village
- Location within Poland
- Coordinates: 51°48′46″N 18°53′35″E
- Country: Poland
- Voivodeship: Łódź
- County: Poddębice
- Gmina: Zadzim

Wierzchy [ˈvjɛʂxɨ] is a village in the administrative district of Gmina Zadzim, within Poddębice County, Łódź Voivodeship, in central Poland.
