= Domaniew, Poddębice County =

Domaniew
- Village
- Location within Poland
- Coordinates: 51°55′39″N 19°3′45″E
- Country: Poland
- Voivodeship: Łódź
- County: Poddębice
- Gmina: Dalików
- Population: 131

Domaniew [dɔˈmaɲɛf] is a village in the administrative district of Gmina Dalików, within Poddębice County, Łódź Voivodeship, in central Poland.
