= Sikory, Łódź Voivodeship =

Sikory
- Settlement
- Location within Poland
- Coordinates: 51°47′17″N 18°58′37″E
- Country: Poland
- Voivodeship: Łódź
- County: Poddębice
- Gmina: Zadzim

Sikory [ɕiˈkɔrɨ] is a settlement in the administrative district of Gmina Zadzim, within Poddębice County, Łódź Voivodeship, in central Poland.
