= Madaje Stare =

- Village
- Location within Poland
- Coordinates: 51°49′26″N 19°5′52″E
- Country: Poland
- Voivodeship: Łódź
- County: Poddębice
- Gmina: Dalików

Madaje Stare [maˈdajɛ ˈstarɛ] is a village in the administrative district of Gmina Dalików, within Poddębice County, Łódź Voivodeship, in central Poland.
