= Marcinów, Poddębice County =

Marcinów
- Village
- Location within Poland
- Coordinates: 51°45′9″N 18°51′8″E
- Country: Poland
- Voivodeship: Łódź
- County: Poddębice
- Gmina: Zadzim
- Population: 145 (2,005)

Marcinów [marˈt͡ɕinuf] is a village in the administrative district of Gmina Zadzim, within Poddębice County, Łódź Voivodeship, in central Poland.
