= Wola Zaleska, Łódź Voivodeship =

Wola Zaleska
- Village
- Location within Poland
- Coordinates: 51°46′14″N 18°52′43″E
- Country: Poland
- Voivodeship: Łódź
- County: Poddębice
- Gmina: Zadzim

Wola Zaleska [ˈvɔla zaˈlɛska] is a village in the administrative district of Gmina Zadzim, within Poddębice County, Łódź Voivodeship, in central Poland.
