= Urszulin, Łódź Voivodeship =

Urszulin
- Village
- Location within Poland
- Coordinates: 51°48′53″N 18°49′12″E
- Country: Poland
- Voivodeship: Łódź
- County: Poddębice
- Gmina: Zadzim
- Population: 50

Urszulin (Polish pronunciation: [urˈʂulin]) is a village in the administrative district of Gmina Zadzim, within Poddębice County, Łódź Voivodeship, in central Poland.
