= Gmina Dalików =

Gmina Dalików Dalików Commune
- Gmina
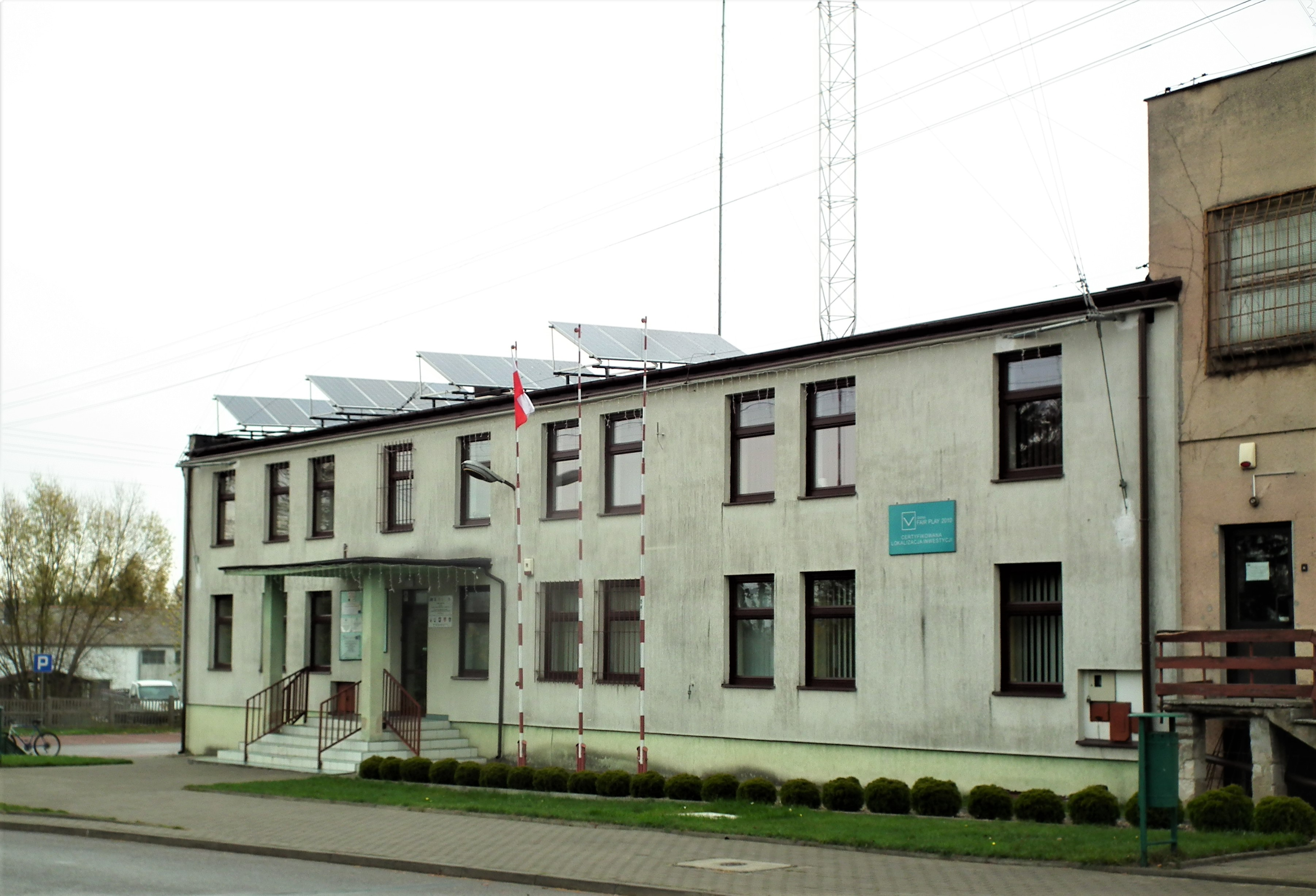
- Municipal building of Dalików

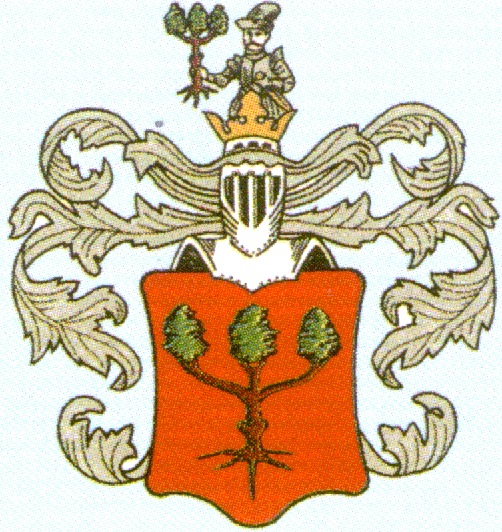
- Coat of arms
- Interactive map of Gmina Dalików
- Coordinates (Dalików): 51°52′55″N 19°6′13″E
- Country: Poland
- Voivodeship: Łódź
- County: Poddębice
- Seat: Dalików

Area
  - Total: 112.7 km^{2} (43.5 sq mi)

Population (2006)
  - Total: 3,650
  - Density: 32.4/km^{2} (83.9/sq mi)
- Time zone: UTC+1 (CET)
  - Summer (DST): UTC+2 (CEST)
- Website: dalikow.eu

Gmina Dalików is a rural gmina (administrative district) in Poddębice County, Łódź Voivodeship, in central Poland. Its seat is the village of Dalików, which lies approximately 10 kilometres (6 mi) east of Poddębice and 28 km (17 mi) north-west of the regional capital Łódź.

The gmina covers an area of 112.7 square kilometres (43.5 sq mi), and as of 2006 its total population is 3,650.

== Villages ==
Gmina Dalików contains the villages and settlements of:

- Bardzynin
- Brudnów
- Brudnów Stary
- Budzynek
- Dąbrówka Nadolna
- Dalików
- Domaniew
- Domaniewek
- Fułki
- Gajówka-Kolonia
- Gajówka-Parcel
- Gajówka-Wieś
- Idzikowice
- Kołoszyn
- Kontrewers
- Krasnołany
- Krzemieniew
- Kuciny
- Madaje Stare
- Oleśnica
- Psary
- Sarnów
- Sarnówek
- Wilczyca
- Zdrzychów
- Złotniki

== Neighbouring gminas ==
Gmina Dalików is bordered by the gminas of Aleksandrów Łódzki, Lutomiersk, Parzęczew, Poddębice and Wartkowice.
