= Gajówka-Wieś =

- Village
- Location within Poland
- Coordinates: 51°52′39″N 19°9′2″E
- Country: Poland
- Voivodeship: Łódź
- County: Poddębice
- Gmina: Dalików

Gajówka-Wieś [ɡaˈjufka ˈvjɛɕ] is a village in the administrative district of Gmina Dalików, within Poddębice County, Łódź Voivodeship, in central Poland.
