= Józefów, Gmina Zadzim =

Józefów
- Settlement
- Location within Poland
- Coordinates: 51°45′N 18°50′E
- Country: Poland
- Voivodeship: Łódź
- County: Poddębice
- Gmina: Zadzim

Józefów (Polish pronunciation: [juˈzɛfuf]) is a settlement in the administrative district of Gmina Zadzim, within Poddębice County, Łódź Voivodeship, in central Poland.
