= Jakub Zadzik =

Polish diplomat

- Bishop of Chełmno; Bishop of Kraków
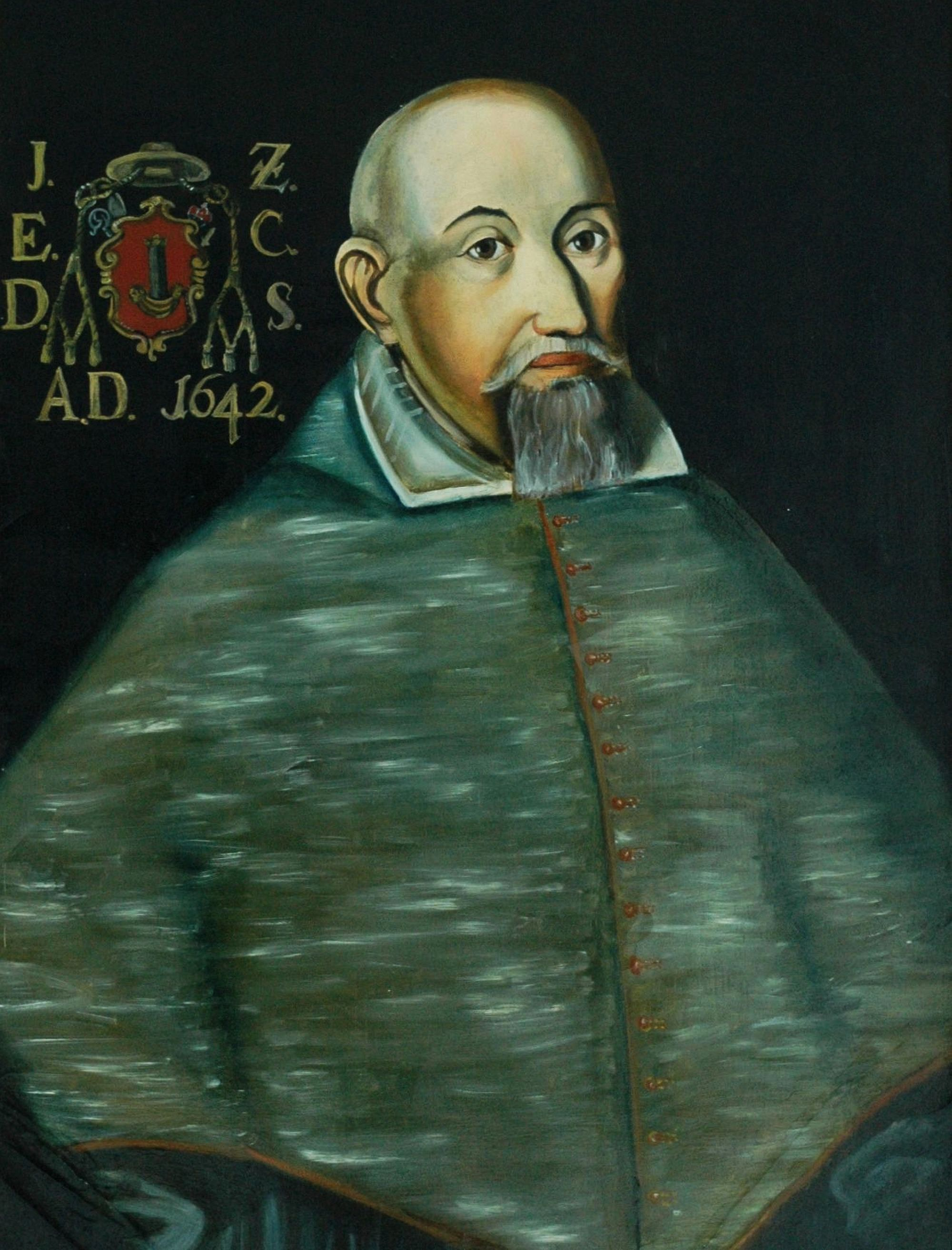
- Installed: 1624 - 1635

Personal details
- Born: 1582 Drużbin, Poland
- Died: 17 March 1642 (aged 59–60) Bodzentyn, Poland

Jakub Zadzik (1582 – 17 March 1642) was a Polish Great Crown Secretary from 1613 to 1627, bishop of Chełmno from 1624, Crown Deputy Chancellor from 1627, Great Crown Chancellor from 1628 to 1635, bishop of Kraków from 1635, diplomat, szlachcic, magnate in the Polish–Lithuanian Commonwealth. His coat of arms was Korab.

== Biography ==
He was born in Drużbin, Poddębice County, Poland. In 1626, Jakub Zadzik was instrumental in convincing the Sejm in Toruń to increase taxes in order to generate funds for the war against Sweden and to create a commission for reformation of the military treasury.

He negotiated the Treaty of Altmark in 1629 and the Treaty of Sztumska Wieś in 1635 with Sweden, which ended the Polish-Swedish War, and the Treaty of Polanów with Russia in 1634, ending the Smolensk War.

He was a dedicated Catholic and a supporter of the Counter-Reformation. In 1638 he succeeded in closing the Polish Brethren center in Raków. He often opposed Władysław IV Waza, especially his actions designed to regain the throne of Sweden and strengthen the powers of the monarchy by means of military action.

Zadzik sponsored the Cracow Bishops' Palace in Kielce, now a museum.

== Bibliography ==
- Kuczyński Janusz "Kielecka rezydencja biskupów krakowskich" Rocznik Muzeum Narodowego w Kielcach, tom 15, Wydawnictwo Literackie, Kraków - Wrocław - 1990 ISBN 83-08-01903-X
