= Leopold Pilichowski =

Polish artist (1869-1933)

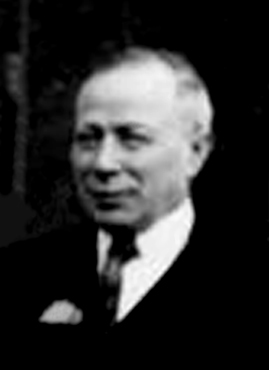
- Pilichowski in London, England
- Born: Leopold (Lejb) Pilichowski; March 23, 1869; Zadzim, Kalisz Governorate, Congress Poland
- Died: July 28, 1934 (aged 65); London, England
- Known for: Painting and illustration
- Movement: Realism

Leopold Pilichowski (March 23, 1869 – July 28, 1933) was a Polish Jewish realist painter in the late 19th and early 20th centuries, active during the final years of the foreign partitions of Poland. He was known for his commitment to social commentary and psychological depictions of Jewish themes and characters. In 1914, at the age of 45, Pilichowski emigrated to Great Britain. He served as president of the Association of Polish Jews in London. From 1926 until his death, he was also the president of the Ben Uri Art Society. His work can be found in the permanent collections of the National Museums in Kraków and Warsaw and the City Museum of Łódź. More representative work is held at the Jewish Museum of New York ("Sukkot").

== Life ==
Pilichowski was born in Piła near Sieradz in central Poland (some sources list the village of Zadzim close to Piła). He began his art education with painter Szmul (Samuel) Hirszenberg, his relative, in the nearby metropolitan city of Łódź. He continued art studies in Warsaw with Professor Wojciech Gerson (1886), then in Munich, at the Academy of Fine Arts, and in Paris, at the Académie Julian. While in France, he also exhibited his paintings for the first time. In 1894, he had his first solo exhibition in Łódź.

Pilichowski settled in Łódź around 1894, and began to produce his first engaging paintings about Jewish life in an industrialized environment. He portrayed peddlers, migrants, exhausted travellers at railway stations and dignified mourners at funerals. He also depicted Jewish prayers, gatherings, festivals and holy days. Pilichowski became an active Zionist around 1908 and turned to political portraiture of Zionist leaders. He moved to Paris in 1904, and to London a decade later, with his wife and young children. He visited Mandate Palestine in 1925. While there, he produced a monumental painting showing some 120 people for the opening of the Hebrew University in Jerusalem, a group portrait which included himself. Back in London, he also painted impoverished Jews from the Whitechapel district. Pilichowski was married to Lena Pilichowski in Poland and had 4 children while in France. He died in London either in 1933 (according to some), or more likely in 1934.

Pilichowski was recognised as a Chevalier du Legion d'honneur by the French Government, for his services to France.

== Selected paintings ==
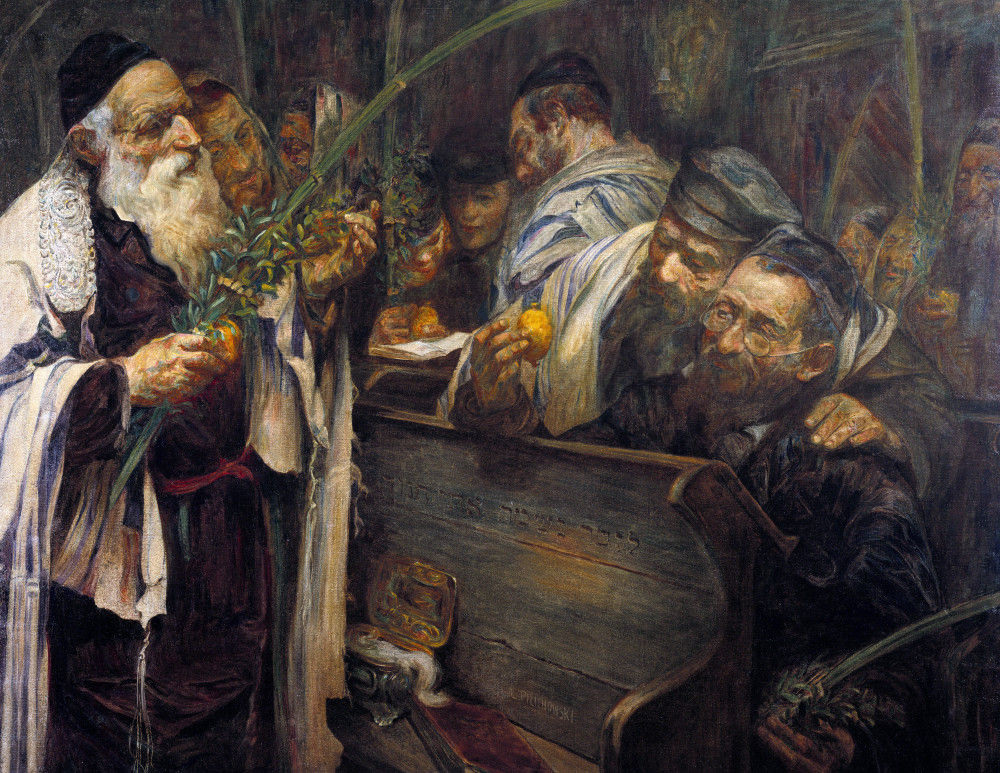
Sukkot (Examining the Four Species)

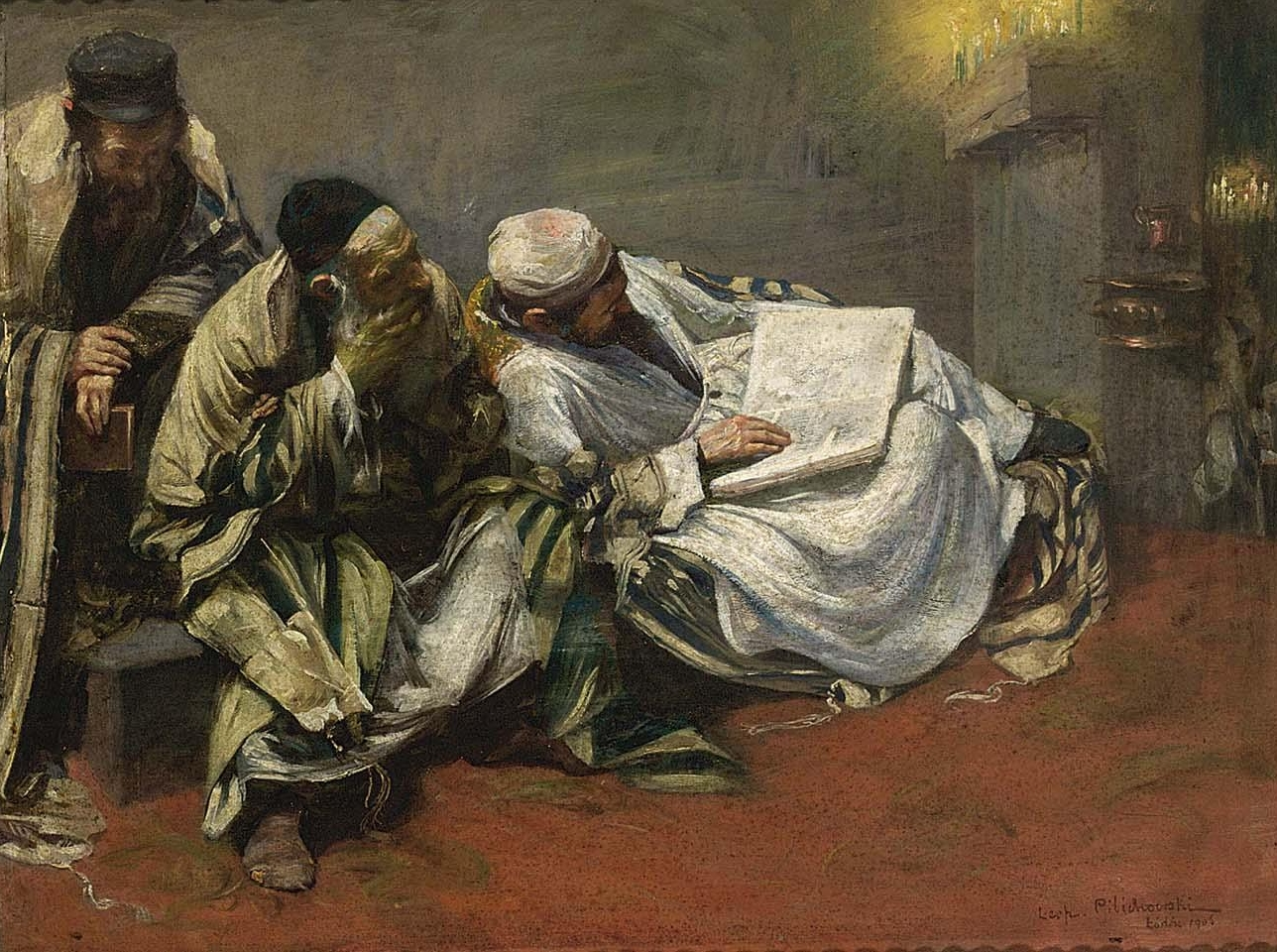
Yom Kippur

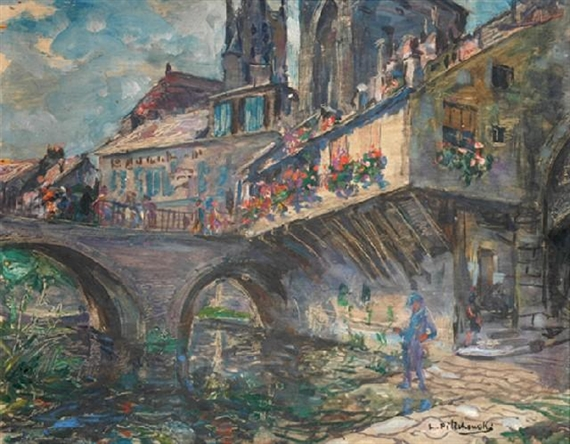
Figure by the Bridge

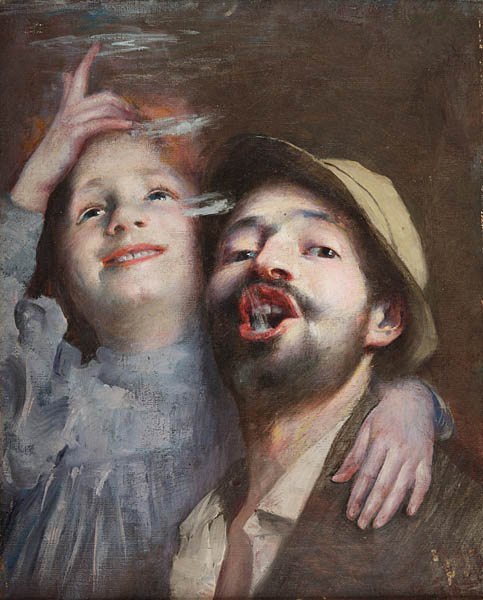
Mountebank
