= Nowy Świat, Poddębice County =

Nowy Świat
- Settlement
- Location within Poland
- Coordinates: 51°47′4″N 18°58′40″E
- Country: Poland
- Voivodeship: Łódź
- County: Poddębice
- Gmina: Zadzim

Nowy Świat (Polish pronunciation: [ˈnɔvɨ ˈɕfjat]) is a settlement in the administrative district of Gmina Zadzim, within Poddębice County, Łódź Voivodeship, in central Poland.
