= Anusin, Poddębice County =

Anusin
- Village
- Location within Poland
- Coordinates: 51°48′37″N 18°56′36″E
- Country: Poland
- Voivodeship: Łódź
- County: Poddębice
- Gmina: Zadzim
- Population: 49

Anusin [aˈnuɕin] is a village in the administrative district of Gmina Zadzim, within Poddębice County, Łódź Voivodeship, in central Poland.
