= Hilarów =

Hilarów may refer to the following places:

- Hilarów, Łódź Voivodeship (central Poland)
- Hilarów, Sochaczew County in Masovian Voivodeship (east-central Poland)
- Hilarów, Sokołów County in Masovian Voivodeship (east-central Poland)
- Hilarów, Greater Poland Voivodeship (west-central Poland)
