= Krystyna Wituska =

Polish resistance fighter (1920-1944)

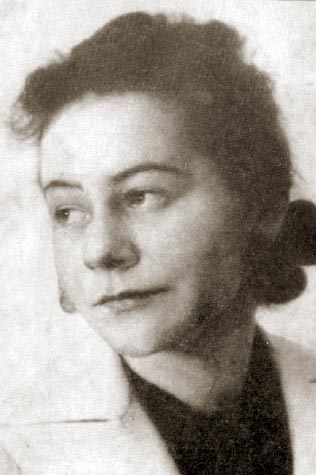
- Born: 12 May 1920; Jeżew, Poland
- Died: 26 June 1944 (aged 24); Halle (Saale), Germany
- Occupation: Resistance fighter

Krystyna Wituska (12 May 1920 – 1944) was a Polish resistance fighter during World War II. Captured in 1942 while working as a spy for the Home Army (Armia Krajowa), she was guillotined by the Germans in 1944. Wituska is remembered for a collection of her letters and messages secreted out of prison.

== Early life ==
Born in Jeżew near Łódź, she came from a wealthy family and grew up on a large sugar beet plantation owned by her father. Wituska received her early education at home from governesses. On the eve of World War II, Wituska was attending finishing school in Switzerland but returned to Poland.

== Resistance activities ==
In 1941, at the age of 20, she joined the Polish underground resistance movement, first as a member of the “Union for Armed Struggle (Związek Walki Zbrojnej) and later the Home Army. Among other activities directed at the German occupation, she frequented Warsaw coffee houses, flirting with Wehrmacht soldiers to find out the names of their officers and gather information on troop deployments.

== Arrest and execution ==
In October 1942, Wituska was captured by the German Gestapo with two other women comrades, and was taken for interrogation to Berlin. In April 1943, they were tried before the Reichskriegsgericht, the highest military court. Wituska alone was sentenced to death. A direct appeal to Hitler for clemency was rejected. In June 1944, Wituska, aged 24, was executed by guillotine on 26 June 1944 in the “Roter Ochse” prison in Halle/Saale.

== Prison letters ==
Thanks to the sympathies of a female prison guard Hedwig Grimpe and her 16 year-old Helga Grimpe, Wituska was able to exchange notes with her fellow prisoners. These included the German resistance fighter Maria Terwiel, from whom, prior to her own execution, Wituska received a farewell letter. The Grimpes were able to save much of this correspondence. Letters they secreted out to Wituska's parents also survived. This material subsequently became part of the historical record of Polish resistance during World War II, offering a personal perspective on the struggles and sacrifices made by young people fighting against occupation.

In a final, farewell, letter to her parents she wrote:

Please believe me, though, that I can meet my death with my head held high and without fear. This is my final duty to you and to my country. For me, prison was a good and sometimes also difficult lesson in life, but there were days that were so joyous and sunny. (...) We will die on the eve of victory and with the knowledge that we have not acted against injustice and violence in vain.

== See also ==
- Resistance during World War II
