= Wola Dąbska =

- Settlement
- Location within Poland
- Coordinates: 51°47′50″N 18°51′21″E
- Country: Poland
- Voivodeship: Łódź
- County: Poddębice
- Gmina: Zadzim

Wola Dąbska [ˈvɔla ˈdɔmpska] is a settlement in the administrative district of Gmina Zadzim, within Poddębice County, Łódź Voivodeship, in central Poland.
