= Łyszkowice, Poddębice County =

Łyszkowice
- Village
- Location within Poland
- Coordinates: 51°52′2″N 18°42′19″E
- Country: Poland
- Voivodeship: Łódź
- County: Poddębice
- Gmina: Pęczniew

Łyszkowice [wɨʂkɔˈvit͡sɛ] is a village in the administrative district of Gmina Pęczniew, within Poddębice County, Łódź Voivodeship, in central Poland.
