= Wola Pomianowa =

- Village
- Location within Poland
- Coordinates: 51°51′N 18°51′E
- Country: Poland
- Voivodeship: Łódź
- County: Poddębice
- Gmina: Pęczniew

Wola Pomianowa [ˈvɔla pɔmjaˈnɔva] is a village in the administrative district of Gmina Pęczniew, within Poddębice County, Łódź Voivodeship, in central Poland.
