= Krasnołany =

- Village
- Location within Poland
- Coordinates: 51°55′N 19°2′E
- Country: Poland
- Voivodeship: Łódź
- County: Poddębice
- Gmina: Dalików
- Population: 40

Krasnołany [krasnɔˈwanɨ] is a village in the administrative district of Gmina Dalików, within Poddębice County, Łódź Voivodeship, in central Poland.
