= Leszkomin =

- Village
- Location within Poland
- Coordinates: 51°45′0″N 18°56′25″E
- Country: Poland
- Voivodeship: Łódź
- County: Poddębice
- Gmina: Zadzim
- Population: 50

Leszkomin [lɛʂˈkɔmin] is a village in the administrative district of Gmina Zadzim, within Poddębice County, Łódź Voivodeship, in central Poland.
