= Annów, Poddębice County =

Annów
- Settlement
- Location within Poland
- Coordinates: 51°49′13″N 18°47′15″E
- Country: Poland
- Voivodeship: Łódź
- County: Poddębice
- Gmina: Zadzim
- Population: 40

Annów [ˈannuf] is a settlement in the administrative district of Gmina Zadzim, within Poddębice County, Łódź Voivodeship, in central Poland.
