= Brudnów Stary =

- Village
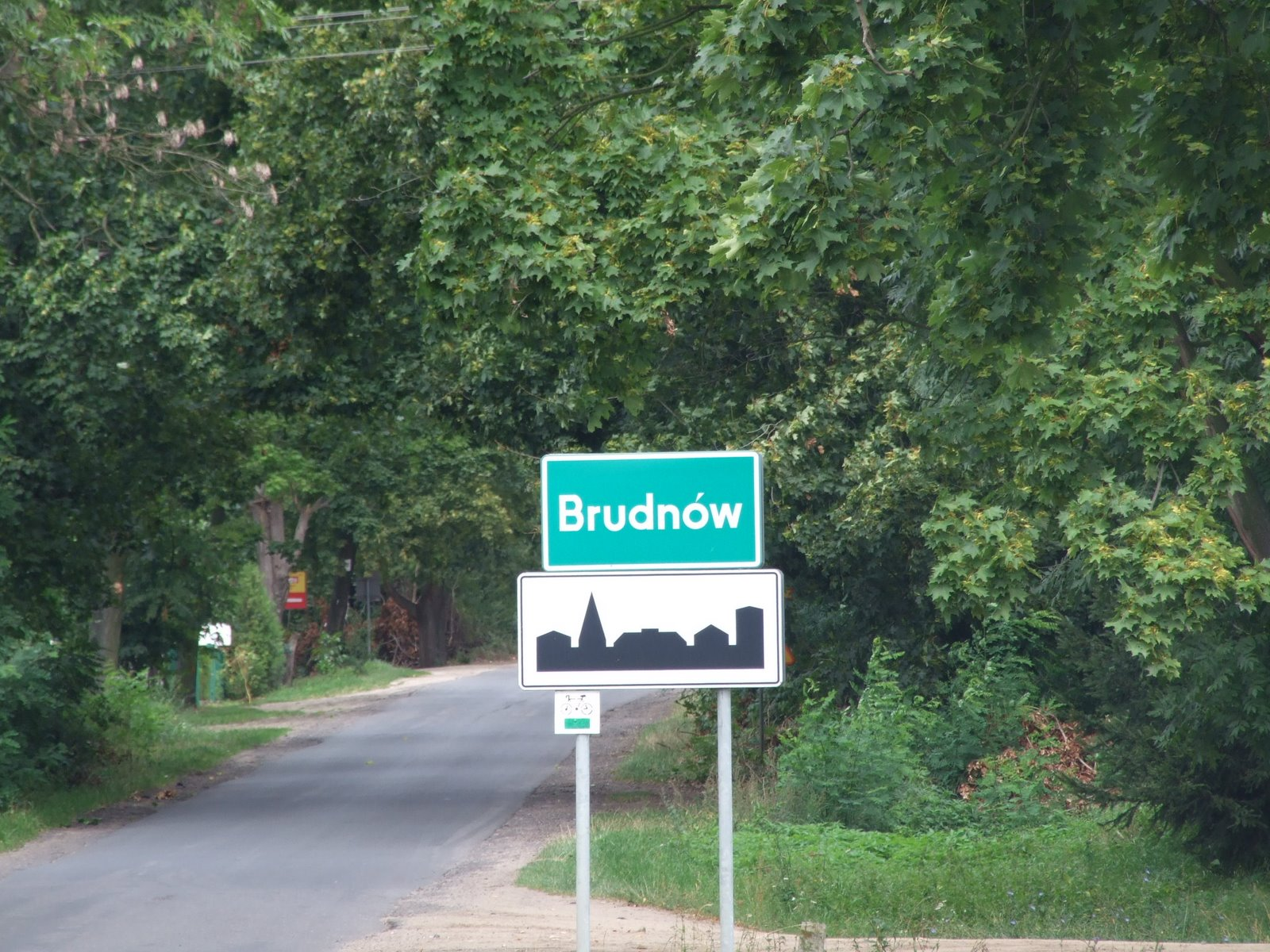
- Road sign leading to Brudnów Stary

- Location within Poland
- Coordinates: 51°54′40″N 19°04′45″E
- Country: Poland
- Voivodeship: Łódź
- County: Poddębice
- Gmina: Dalików

Brudnów Stary [ˈbrudnuf ˈstarɨ] is a village in the administrative district of Gmina Dalików, within Poddębice County, Łódź Voivodeship, in central Poland.
