= Gajówka-Kolonia =

Village in Gmina Dalików, Poland

- Village
- Location within Poland
- Coordinates: 51°52′40″N 19°08′55″E
- Country: Poland
- Voivodeship: Łódź
- County: Poddębice
- Gmina: Dalików

Gajówka-Kolonia [ɡaˈjufka kɔˈlɔɲa] is a village in the administrative district of Gmina Dalików, within Poddębice County, Łódź Voivodeship, in central Poland.
