= Domaniewek =

Domaniewek may refer to the following places in Poland:

- Domaniewek, Łódź Voivodeship (central Poland)
- Domaniewek, Masovian Voivodeship (east-central Poland)
