= Pałki, Łódź Voivodeship =

Pałki
- Village
- Location within Poland
- Coordinates: 51°48′1″N 18°49′54″E
- Country: Poland
- Voivodeship: Łódź
- County: Poddębice
- Gmina: Zadzim
- Elevation: 147 m (482 ft)
- Population: 259

Pałki [ˈpau̯ki] is a village in the administrative district of Gmina Zadzim, within Poddębice County, Łódź Voivodeship, in central Poland.
