= Kołoszyn =

- Village
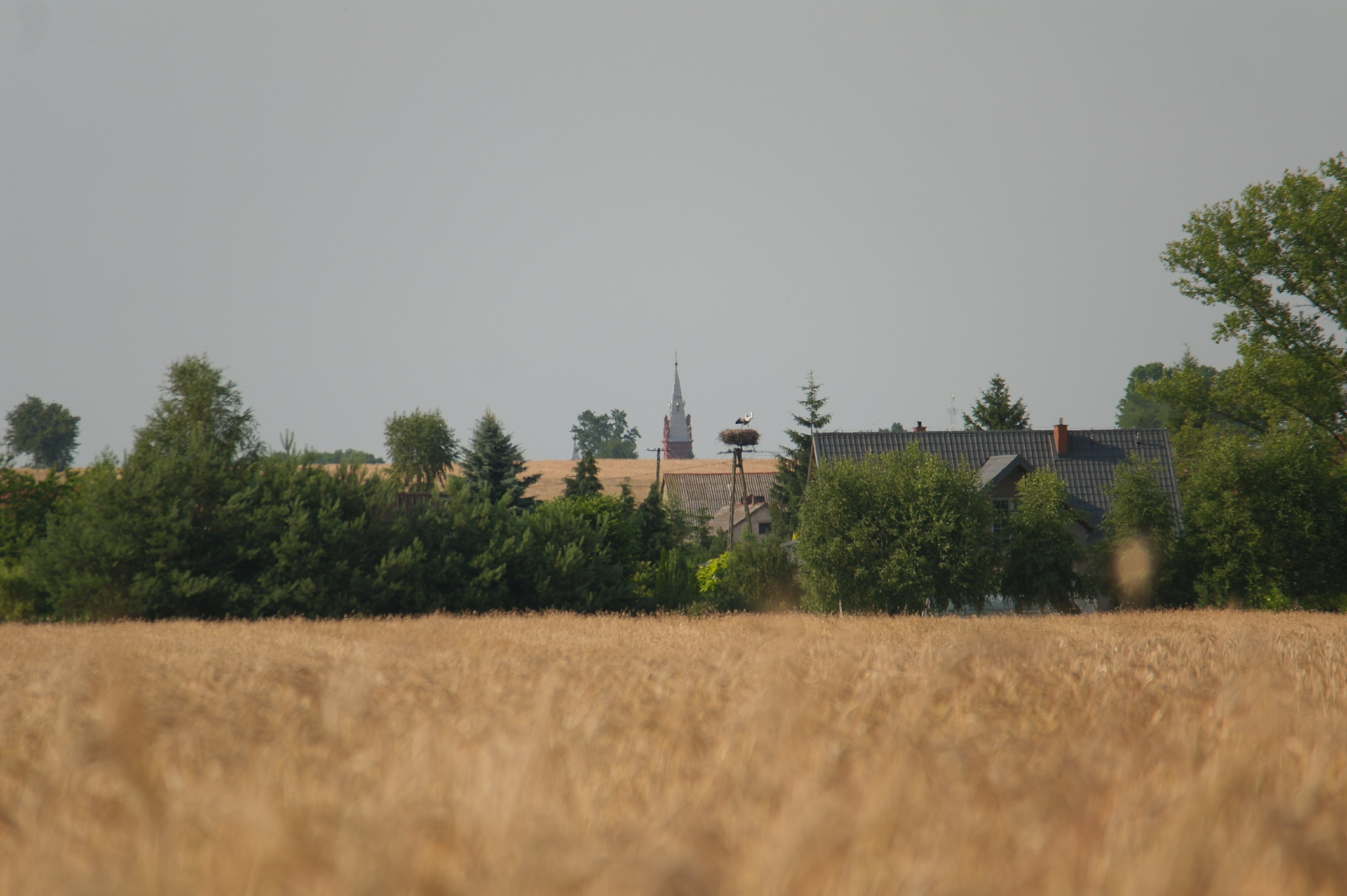
- Ciconia nest in Kołoszyn

- Location within Poland
- Coordinates: 51°51′44″N 19°06′03″E
- Country: Poland
- Voivodeship: Łódź
- County: Poddębice
- Gmina: Dalików

Kołoszyn [kɔˈwɔʂɨn] is a village in the administrative district of Gmina Dalików, within Poddębice County, Łódź Voivodeship, in central Poland.
