= Oleśnica, Poddębice County =

Oleśnica
- Village
- Location within Poland
- Coordinates: 51°49′55″N 19°4′53″E
- Country: Poland
- Voivodeship: Łódź
- County: Poddębice
- Gmina: Dalików

Oleśnica (Polish pronunciation: [ɔlɛˈɕɲit͡sa]) is a village in the administrative district of Gmina Dalików, within Poddębice County, Łódź Voivodeship, in central Poland.
