= Gmina Zadzim =

Gmina Zadzim Zadzim Commune
- Gmina
- Coat of arms
- Interactive map of Gmina Zadzim
- Coordinates (Zadzim): 51°47′N 18°51′E
- Country: Poland
- Voivodeship: Łódź
- County: Poddębice
- Seat: Zadzim

Area
  - Total: 144.36 km^{2} (55.74 sq mi)

Population (2006)
  - Total: 5,341
  - Density: 37.00/km^{2} (95.82/sq mi)

Gmina Zadzim is a rural gmina (administrative district) in Poddębice County, Łódź Voivodeship, in central Poland. Its seat is the village of Zadzim, which lies approximately 16 kilometres (10 mi) south-west of Poddębice and 43 km (27 mi) west of the regional capital Łódź.

The gmina covers an area of 144.36 square kilometres (55.7 sq mi), and as of 2006 its total population is 5,341.

== Villages ==
Gmina Zadzim contains the villages and settlements of Adamka, Alfonsów, Annów, Anusin, Babiniec, Bąki, Bogucice, Bratków Dolny, Bratków Górny, Budy Jeżewskie, Charchów Księży, Charchów Pański, Chodaki, Dąbrówka, Dąbrówka D, Dzierzązna Szlachecka, Głogowiec, Górki Zadzimskie, Grabina, Grabinka, Hilarów, Iwonie, Jeżew, Jeżew PGR, Józefów, Kazimierzew, Kłoniszew, Kolonia Chodaki, Kolonia Grabinka, Kolonia Piła, Kolonia Rudunki, Kolonia Rzeczyca, Kraszyn, Leszkomin, Maksymilianów, Małyń, Marcinów, Nowy Świat, Otok, Otok PKP, Pałki, Pietrachy, Piła, Piotrów, Ralewice, Ruda Jeżewska, Rudunki, Rzechta Drużbińska, Rzeczyca, Sikory, Skęczno, Szczawno Rzeczyckie, Urszulin, Walentynów, Wierzchy, Wiorzyska, Wola Dąbska, Wola Flaszczyna, Wola Sipińska, Wola Zaleska, Wyrębów, Zaborów, Zadzim, Zalesie, Zalesie PGR, Zawady, Żerniki and Zygry.

== Neighbouring gminas ==
Gmina Zadzim is bordered by the gminas of Lutomiersk, Pęczniew, Poddębice, Szadek, Warta and Wodzierady.
