= Zagórki =

Zagórki may refer to the following places:

- Zagórki, Łódź Voivodeship (central Poland)
- Zagórki, Podlaskie Voivodeship (north-east Poland)
- Zagórki, Pomeranian Voivodeship (north Poland)
- Zagórki, Człuchów County in Pomeranian Voivodeship (north Poland)
- Zagórki, West Pomeranian Voivodeship (north-west Poland)
