= Żerniki =

Żerniki may refer to the following places:

- Żerniki, Cuiavian-Pomeranian Voivodeship (north-central Poland)
  - Żerniki, Inowrocław County (south Cuiavian-Pomeranian Voivodeship)
  - Żerniki, Żnin County (west Cuiavian-Pomeranian Voivodeship)
- Żerniki, Łódź Voivodeship (central Poland)
- Żerniki, Lublin Voivodeship (east Poland)
- Żerniki, Świętokrzyskie Voivodeship (south-central Poland)
  - Żerniki, Jędrzejów County (west-central Świętokrzyskie Voivodeship)
  - Żerniki, Opatów County (east-central Świętokrzyskie Voivodeship)
  - Żerniki Dolne, Busko County (south Świętokrzyskie Voivodeship)
  - Żerniki Górne, Busko County (south Świętokrzyskie Voivodeship)
- Żerniki, Masovian Voivodeship (east-central Poland)
- Żerniki, Greater Poland Voivodeship (west-central Poland)
  - Żerniki, Jarocin County (south-central Greater Poland Voivodeship)
  - Żerniki, Kalisz County (south-east Greater Poland Voivodeship)
  - Żerniki, Oborniki County (north-central Greater Poland Voivodeship)
  - Żerniki, Poznań County (central Greater Poland Voivodeship)
  - Żerniki, Września County (east Greater Poland Voivodeship)
- Żerniki, Lower Silesian Voivodeship (south-west Poland)
  - Żerniki, Wrocław, district in Fabryczna, Wrocław
  - Żerniki Małe
  - Żerniki Wielkie
  - Żerniki Wrocławskie
- Żerniki, Gliwice, neighbourhood in Gliwice, Silesian Voivodeship (south Poland)
