= Zalesie, Gmina Zadzim =

Zalesie
- Village
- Location within Poland
- Coordinates: 51°45′38″N 18°55′6″E
- Country: Poland
- Voivodeship: Łódź
- County: Poddębice
- Gmina: Zadzim

Zalesie [zaˈlɛɕɛ] is a village in the administrative district of Gmina Zadzim, within Poddębice County, Łódź Voivodeship, in central Poland.
