= Bratków Górny =

- Village
- Location within Poland
- Coordinates: 51°49′35″N 18°53′18″E
- Country: Poland
- Voivodeship: Łódź
- County: Poddębice
- Gmina: Zadzim
- Population: 83

Bratków Górny [ˈbratkuf ˈɡurnɨ] is a village in the administrative district of Gmina Zadzim within Poddębice County, Łódź Voivodeship in central Poland.
