= Charchów Księży =

- Village
- Location within Poland
- Coordinates: 51°49′N 18°51′E
- Country: Poland
- Voivodeship: Łódź
- County: Poddębice
- Gmina: Zadzim

Charchów Księży [ˈxarxuf ˈkɕɛ̃ʐɨ] is a village in the administrative district of Gmina Zadzim, within Poddębice County, Łódź Voivodeship, in central Poland.
