= Idzikowice, Poddębice County =

Idzikowice
- Village
- Location within Poland
- Coordinates: 51°56′51″N 19°6′6″E
- Country: Poland
- Voivodeship: Łódź
- County: Poddębice
- Gmina: Dalików

Idzikowice [id͡ʑikɔˈvit͡sɛ] is a village in the administrative district of Gmina Dalików, within Poddębice County, Łódź Voivodeship, in central Poland.
