= Brudnów, Łódź Voivodeship =

Brudnów
- Village
- Location within Poland
- Coordinates: 51°55′1″N 19°5′9″E
- Country: Poland
- Voivodeship: Łódź
- County: Poddębice
- Gmina: Dalików

Brudnów [ˈbrudnuf] is a village in the administrative district of Gmina Dalików, within Poddębice County, Łódź Voivodeship, in central Poland.
