= Piotrów, Poddębice County =

Piotrów
- Village
- Location within Poland
- Coordinates: 51°48′55″N 18°54′33″E
- Country: Poland
- Voivodeship: Łódź
- County: Poddębice
- Gmina: Zadzim

Piotrów [ˈpjɔtruf] is a village in the administrative district of Gmina Zadzim, within Poddębice County, Łódź Voivodeship, in central Poland.
