= Walentynów, Poddębice County =

Walentynów
- Settlement
- Location within Poland
- Coordinates: 51°49′53″N 18°50′23″E
- Country: Poland
- Voivodeship: Łódź
- County: Poddębice
- Gmina: Zadzim

Walentynów [valɛnˈtɨnuf] is a settlement in the administrative district of Gmina Zadzim, within Poddębice County, Łódź Voivodeship, in central Poland.
