= Ruda Jeżewska =

- Village
- Location within Poland
- Coordinates: 51°49′N 19°0′E
- Country: Poland
- Voivodeship: Łódź
- County: Poddębice
- Gmina: Zadzim

Ruda Jeżewska [ˈruda jɛˈʐɛfska] is a village in the administrative district of Gmina Zadzim, within Poddębice County, Łódź Voivodeship, in central Poland.

From 1975 until 1998, Ruda Jeżewska was part of the former Sieradz Voivodeship.
