= Kraczynki =

- Village
- Location within Poland
- Coordinates: 51°49′N 18°45′E
- Country: Poland
- Voivodeship: Łódź
- County: Poddębice
- Gmina: Pęczniew
- Population: 160

Kraczynki [kraˈt͡ʂɨnki] is a village in the administrative district of Gmina Pęczniew, within Poddębice County, Łódź Voivodeship, in central Poland.
