= Kolonia Chodaki =

- Settlement
- Location within Poland
- Coordinates: 51°46′56″N 18°55′12″E
- Country: Poland
- Voivodeship: Łódź
- County: Poddębice
- Gmina: Zadzim

Kolonia Chodaki [kɔˈlɔɲa xɔˈdaki] is a settlement in the administrative district of Gmina Zadzim, within Poddębice County, Łódź Voivodeship, in central Poland.
