= Przywidz =

Przywidz may refer to:

- Przywidz, Łódź Voivodeship, a village in Poddębice County, Łódź Voivodeship, Poland
- Przywidz, Pomeranian Voivodeship, a village in Gdańsk County, Pomeranian Voivodeship, Poland
