= Budy Jeżewskie =

- Settlement
- Location within Poland
- Coordinates: 51°48′51″N 18°57′25″E
- Country: Poland
- Voivodeship: Łódź
- County: Poddębice
- Gmina: Zadzim
- Population: 17

Budy Jeżewskie [ˈbudɨ jɛˈʐɛfskʲɛ] is a settlement in the administrative district of Gmina Zadzim, within Poddębice County, Łódź Voivodeship, in central Poland.
