= Dąbrówka Nadolna =

- Village
- Location within Poland
- Coordinates: 51°54′16″N 19°8′4″E
- Country: Poland
- Voivodeship: Łódź
- County: Poddębice
- Gmina: Dalików

Dąbrówka Nadolna [dɔmˈbrufka naˈdɔlna] is a village in the administrative district of Gmina Dalików, within Poddębice County, Łódź Voivodeship, in central Poland.
