= Wyrębów, Łódź Voivodeship =

Wyrębów
- Village
- Location within Poland
- Coordinates: 51°50′45″N 18°51′56″E
- Country: Poland
- Voivodeship: Łódź
- County: Poddębice
- Gmina: Zadzim
- Population: 120

Wyrębów [vɨˈrɛmbuf] is a village in the administrative district of Gmina Zadzim, within Poddębice County, Łódź Voivodeship, in central Poland.
