= Kazimierzew =

- Village
- Location within Poland
- Coordinates: 51°46′56″N 18°51′1″E
- Country: Poland
- Voivodeship: Łódź
- County: Poddębice
- Gmina: Zadzim
- Population: 160

Kazimierzew [kaʑiˈmjɛʐɛf] is a village in the administrative district of Gmina Zadzim, within Poddębice County, Łódź Voivodeship, in central Poland.
