= Księża Wólka =

- Village
- Location within Poland
- Coordinates: 51°51′20″N 18°45′39″E
- Country: Poland
- Voivodeship: Łódź
- County: Poddębice
- Gmina: Pęczniew

Księża Wólka [ˈkɕɛ̃ʐa ˈvulka] is a village in the administrative district of Gmina Pęczniew, within Poddębice County, Łódź Voivodeship, in central Poland.
