= Maksymilianów, Poddębice County =

Maksymilianów
- Village
- Location within Poland
- Coordinates: 51°46′25″N 18°56′4″E
- Country: Poland
- Voivodeship: Łódź
- County: Poddębice
- Gmina: Zadzim
- Population: 110

Maksymilianów [maksɨmiˈljanuf] is a village in the administrative district of Gmina Zadzim, within Poddębice County, Łódź Voivodeship, in central Poland.
