= Górki Zadzimskie =

- Village
- Location within Poland
- Coordinates: 51°47′23″N 18°53′3″E
- Country: Poland
- Voivodeship: Łódź
- County: Poddębice
- Gmina: Zadzim

Górki Zadzimskie [ˈɡurki zaˈd͡ʑimskʲɛ] is a village in the administrative district of Gmina Zadzim, within Poddębice County, Łódź Voivodeship, in central Poland.
