= Rzechta Drużbińska =

- Village
- Location within Poland
- Coordinates: 51°49′28″N 18°48′7″E
- Country: Poland
- Voivodeship: Łódź
- County: Poddębice
- Gmina: Zadzim

Rzechta Drużbińska [ˈʐɛxta druʐˈbiɲska] is a village in the administrative district of Gmina Zadzim, within Poddębice County, Łódź Voivodeship, in central Poland.
