= Rudunki, Łódź Voivodeship =

Rudunki
- Settlement
- Location within Poland
- Coordinates: 51°46′41″N 18°49′36″E
- Country: Poland
- Voivodeship: Łódź
- County: Poddębice
- Gmina: Zadzim

Rudunki [ruˈduŋki] is a settlement in the administrative district of Gmina Zadzim, within Poddębice County, Łódź Voivodeship, in central Poland.
