= Otok, Poddębice County =

Otok
- Village
- Location within Poland
- Coordinates: 51°46′14″N 18°54′9″E
- Country: Poland
- Voivodeship: Łódź
- County: Poddębice
- Gmina: Zadzim

Otok [ˈɔtɔk] is a village in the administrative district of Gmina Zadzim, within Poddębice County, Łódź Voivodeship, in central Poland.
