= Kuciny =

- Village
- Location within Poland
- Coordinates: 51°51′53″N 19°7′4″E
- Country: Poland
- Voivodeship: Łódź
- County: Poddębice
- Gmina: Dalików

Kuciny [kuˈt͡ɕinɨ] (1943–1945 German Kutzingen) is a village in the administrative district of Gmina Dalików, within Poddębice County, Łódź Voivodeship, in central Poland.
