= Kolonia Rudunki =

- Settlement
- Location within Poland
- Country: Poland
- Voivodeship: Łódź
- County: Poddębice
- Gmina: Zadzim

Kolonia Rudunki [kɔˈlɔɲa ruˈdunki] is a settlement in the administrative district of Gmina Zadzim, within Poddębice County, Łódź Voivodeship, in central Poland.
