= Sarnów, Poddębice County =

Sarnów
- Village
- Location within Poland
- Coordinates: 51°50′33″N 19°8′36″E
- Country: Poland
- Voivodeship: Łódź
- County: Poddębice
- Gmina: Dalików

Sarnów [ˈsarnuf] is a village in the administrative district of Gmina Dalików, within Poddębice County, Łódź Voivodeship, in central Poland.
