= Brzeg, Poddębice County =

Brzeg
- Village
- Location within Poland
- Coordinates: 51°45′16″N 18°40′35″E
- Country: Poland
- Voivodeship: Łódź
- County: Poddębice
- Gmina: Pęczniew
- Population: 360

Brzeg [bʐɛk] is a village in the administrative district of Gmina Pęczniew, within Poddębice County, Łódź Voivodeship, in central Poland.
