= Ralewice =

- Village
- Location within Poland
- Coordinates: 51°44′30″N 18°49′45″E
- Country: Poland
- Voivodeship: Łódź
- County: Poddębice
- Gmina: Zadzim

Ralewice [ralɛˈvit͡sɛ] is a village in the administrative district of Gmina Zadzim, within Poddębice County, Łódź Voivodeship, in central Poland.
