= Popów, Poddębice County =

Popów
- Village
- Location within Poland
- Coordinates: 51°49′59″N 18°43′55″E
- Country: Poland
- Voivodeship: Łódź
- County: Poddębice
- Gmina: Pęczniew

Popów [ˈpɔpuf] is a village in the administrative district of Gmina Pęczniew, within Poddębice County, Łódź Voivodeship, in central Poland.
