= Zawady, Poddębice County =

Zawady
- Settlement
- Location within Poland
- Coordinates: 51°49′21″N 18°49′56″E
- Country: Poland
- Voivodeship: Łódź
- County: Poddębice
- Gmina: Zadzim

Zawady [zaˈvadɨ] is a settlement in the administrative district of Gmina Zadzim, within Poddębice County, Łódź Voivodeship, in central Poland.
