= Kolonia Grabinka =

- Settlement
- Location within Poland
- Coordinates: 51°46′46″N 18°50′06″E
- Country: Poland
- Voivodeship: Łódź
- County: Poddębice
- Gmina: Zadzim

Kolonia Grabinka [kɔˈlɔɲa ɡraˈbinka] is a settlement in the administrative district of Gmina Zadzim, within Poddębice County, Łódź Voivodeship, in central Poland.
