= Bogucice (disambiguation) =

Bogucice is a district of Katowice, Poland.

Bogucice may also refer to the following places:

- Bogucice, Lublin Voivodeship (east Poland)
- Bogucice, Łódź Voivodeship (central Poland)
- Bogucice, Bochnia County in Lesser Poland Voivodeship (south Poland)
- Bogucice, Greater Poland Voivodeship (west-central Poland)
