= Kolonia Rzeczyca =

- Settlement
- Location within Poland
- Coordinates: 51°44′16″N 18°51′10″E
- Country: Poland
- Voivodeship: Łódź
- County: Poddębice
- Gmina: Zadzim

Kolonia Rzeczyca [kɔˈlɔɲa ʐɛˈt͡ʂɨt͡sa] is a settlement in the administrative district of Gmina Zadzim, within Poddębice County, Łódź Voivodeship, in central Poland.
