= Bratków Dolny =

- Village
- Location within Poland
- Coordinates: 51°50′N 18°53′E
- Country: Poland
- Voivodeship: Łódź
- County: Poddębice
- Gmina: Zadzim
- Population: 77

Bratków Dolny [ˈbratkuf ˈdɔlnɨ] is a village in the administrative district of Gmina Zadzim, within Poddębice County, Łódź Voivodeship, in central Poland.
