= Grabina, Poddębice County =

Grabina
- Village
- Location within Poland
- Coordinates: 51°45′35″N 18°47′29″E
- Country: Poland
- Voivodeship: Łódź
- County: Poddębice
- Gmina: Zadzim

Grabina [ɡraˈbina] is a village in the administrative district of Gmina Zadzim, within Poddębice County, Łódź Voivodeship, in central Poland.
