= Wolfgang Falck =

German World War II fighter pilot

- Wolfgang Falck
- Born: 19 August 1910; Berlin, Province of Brandenburg, German Empire
- Died: 13 March 2007 (aged 96); St. Ulrich, Tyrol, Austria
- Military career
- Allegiance: Weimar Republic; Nazi Germany
- Branch: Reichswehr; Luftwaffe
- Service years: 1931–1945
- Rank: Oberst (colonel)
- Units: ZG 76, ZG 1, NJG 1
- Commands: NJG 1
- Conflicts: See battles World War II: Polish Campaign; Battle of the Heligoland Bight; Operation Weserübung; Battle of Denmark; Defense of the Reich
- Awards: Knight's Cross of the Iron Cross

Wolfgang Julius Feodor Falck (19 August 1910 – 13 March 2007) was a World War II German Luftwaffe pilot and wing commander and one of the key organisers of the German night fighter defences. As a fighter ace, he claimed eight enemy aircraft shot down in 90 combat missions.

Born in Berlin as the son of Protestant pastor Rudolf Hermann Hugo Hans Falck, Falck volunteered for military service in the Reichsheer of the Weimar Republic in 1931. In parallel, he was accepted for flight training with the Deutsche Verkehrsfliegerschule, a covert military-training organization, and at the Lipetsk fighter-pilot school.

== Early life and career ==
On 7 April 1931, he began his pilot training at the Deutsche Verkehrsfliegerschule (DVS—German Air Transport School) at Schleißheim. He and 29 other trainees were part of Kameradschaft 31 (camaraderie of 1931), abbreviated "K 31". Among the members of "K 31" were future Luftwaffe staff officers Bernd von Brauchitsch, Günther Radusch, Günther Lützow, Ralph von Rettberg and Hannes Trautloft. Falck graduated from the DVS on 31 March 1932. On 15 October 1932, he was transferred as Schütze (rifleman) to the 5th Company of the 7th (Prussian) Infantry Regiment of the Reichswehr.

From 10 July 1933 to 1 March 1934, he attended the Infantry School at Dresden for officer training and made Leutnant (second lieutenant) on 1 October 1934 with rank seniority from 1 March 1934. On 1 October 1934, he was officially transferred from the army to the air force. In March 1935, Leutnant Falck became an instructor at the DVS at Schleissheim and in April 1936 promoted to Oberleutnant.

In September 1936, Falck married Maria Elisabeth "Marilies" Josephine Helene Freiin von Berchem (1910–2009). Marilies was the daughter of retired Colonel Otto Joseph Maximilian Maria Freiherr von Berchem (1877–1949), who was reactivated 1938 and became a Major General of the Luftwaffe in 1944, and his wife Hedwig von Berchem, née Freiin von Stauffenberg. The two were married at the Trinity Church in Munich. Falck's best man was Lützow, his friend from "K 31". Their son Klaus was born on 21 June 1937.

In March 1937, Falck was appointed adjutant to Oberstleutnant Gerd von Massow, the Geschwaderkommodore (wing commander) of Jagdgeschwader 132 "Richthofen" (JG 132—132nd Fighter Wing). On 1 August 1938, he was appointed Staffelkapitän of 8. Staffel (8th squadron), a squadron of the newly created III. Gruppe (3rd group) of JG 132, which was based at Jüterbog-Damm Airfield in Jüterbog. On 1 November, III. Gruppe was renamed to II. Gruppe of Zerstörergeschwader 141 (ZG 141—141st Destroyer Wing), a unit which became the I. Gruppe of Zerstörergeschwader 76 (ZG 76—76th Destroyer Wing) on 1 May 1939. In consequence, Falck commanded the 5. Staffel of ZG 141, and later the 2. Staffel of ZG 76. Initially based at Pardubitz, present-day Pardubice in the Czech Republic, the Gruppe was equipped with the Messerschmitt Bf 110 C-1 heavy fighter. During the prelude of World War II on 25 August 1939 I. Gruppe of ZG 76 deployed to an airfield at Ohlau to the southeast of Breslau.

== World War II ==
On Friday 1 September 1939, German forces invaded Poland starting World War II in Europe. I. Gruppe of ZG 76 participated in this campaign and was based at Märzdorf, present-day Bohdíkov in the Czech Republic, under the command of 6. Fliegerdivision (6th Air Division). On 5 September, Falck claimed his first aerial victory when he shot down a PZL.23 Karaś in combat near Dalików. He claimed two further aerial victories over Polish Air Force aircraft on 11 September. He was credited with the destruction of a Fokker F.IX 8 kilometres (5.0 miles) southeast of Biała Podlaska and a PWS-26 12 km (7.5 mi) southwest of Biała Podlaska.

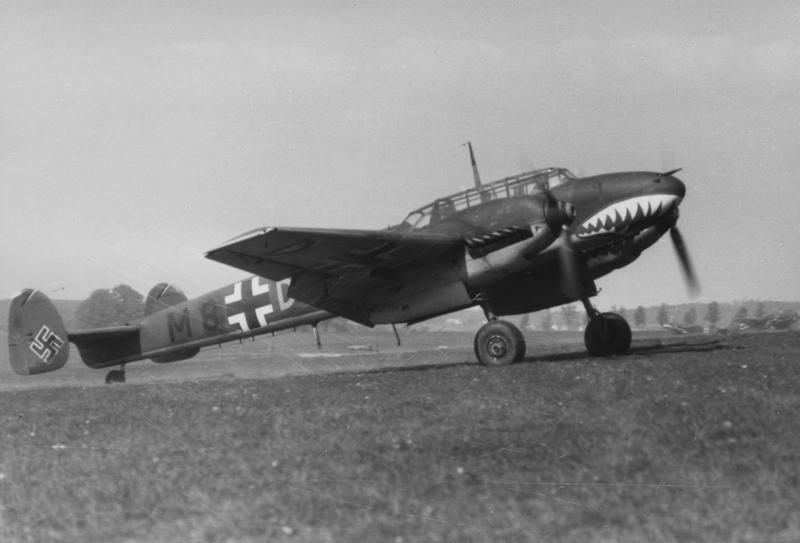
A ZG 76 Bf 110C similar to those flown by Falck

In October, the unit was then relocated, at first to Bönninghardt and on 16 December to Jever, to protect the northern seaboard and the Kriegsmarine naval bases. During the Battle of the Heligoland Bight on 18 December 1939, he was credited with the destruction of a Royal Air Force (RAF) Vickers Wellington twin-engine bomber on a mission to Wilhelmshaven. A Freya radar on Wangerooge, under the command of Leutnant Hermann Diehl, had detected the approaching bombers. Falck had claimed two Wellington bombers shot down southwest of Heligoland, but only one was confirmed. Falck's aircraft was severely damaged, resulting in a forced landing. On 10 January 1940, Falck claimed a Bristol Blenheim bomber from No. 110 Squadron shot down, followed by another No. 110 Squadron Blenheim bomber on 17 February. Blenheim P4859 shot down on 10 January, was on a mission searching for shipping over the North Sea. The crew, pilot Sergeant Henry Hanne, observer Sergeant George Llewelyn William, and Aircraftman 1st Class (AC1) Edwin Vick were killed in action. On 17 February, Blenheim N6211 was also on a search for shipping mission before it was intercepted by Falck. The crew, Sergeant Frederick John Raymond Bigg, Sergeant William Barnard Woods, and AC1 Jack Orchard, were reported as missing in action.

In February 1940, Hauptmann Falck was appointed Gruppenkommandeur of I. Gruppe of Zerstörergeschwader 1 (ZG 1—1st Destroyer Wing), based at Düsseldorf. The Gruppe was relocated to the Baltic coast in April and on 9 April, Falck led the unit during the invasion of Denmark. He recorded his seventh (and final) victory, shooting down a Danish Fokker D.XXI taking off from Værløse. On the night of 30 April and 1 May, 50 RAF Armstrong Whitworth Whitley, Vickers Wellington and Handley Page Hampden bombers attacked Luftwaffe airfields in Norway. Falck, his comrade from "K 31" Radusch, Oberleutnant Werner Streib, and another pilot, followed the bombers shortly before sunup on their flight back to England. The pilots attacked the bombers without claiming any aerial victories. Following this encounter, Falck submitted a comprehensive tactical report on his night interception ideas and experiences to the Reichsluftfahrtministerium (RLM—Ministry of Aviation). Shortly after, Generaloberst Erhard Milch, at the time a state secretary in the RLM and temporary commander of Luftflotte 5 (Air Fleet 5), visited Falck and discussed his ideas personally with him.

I. Gruppe of ZG 1 participated in the Battle of France. On 22 June 1940, General der Flieger Albert Kesselring called Falck that Hermann Göring, commander-in-chief of the Luftwaffe, had tasked him with the creation of the first night fighter unit. His orders were to relocate to Düsseldorf immediately. Four days later, he was ordered to a meeting held at Wassenaar in the German-occupied Netherlands. This meeting was attended by Göring, the Generals Kesselring, Bruno Loerzer, Ernst Udet and Friedrich Christiansen, among others. During the meeting, Göring appointed Falck as Geschwaderkommodore and tasked him with creation of Nachtjagdgeschwader 1 (NJG 1—1st Night Fighter Wing).

=== Creation of the Nachtjagdwaffe ===
Night fighter force emblem.

The emblem of the night fighter force was a creation of Oberleutnant Victor Mölders, brother of Werner Mölders. The emblem, which in parts was based on Falck's family coat of arms, depicts a silver falcon on the dark sky with a red lightning bolt over a section of the globe pointing at London. To support the creation and organization of the nocturnal aerial defenses, the 1. Nachtjagd-Division (1st Night Fighter Division) was created on 17 July 1940. This division was placed under the command of Oberst Josef Kammhuber and was made operational by 1 August at Zeist in the Netherlands. That day, Kammhuber's command structure was further augmented and reorganized as XII. Fliegerkorps (12th Air Corps).

Falck received the Knight's Cross of the Iron Cross (Ritterkreuz des Eisernen Kreuzes) on 7 October 1940 in Berlin. He was to command NJG 1 for three years and in partnership with General Kammhuber develop a highly effective night fighter force.

On 1 July 1943, Falck was promoted to Oberst and transferred to the Generalstab as Kammhuber's representative at the Luftwaffenführungsstab. Falck was then sent to Berlin and appointed within the Luftwaffenbefehlshaber Mitte, as overall responsible for the day and night fighter defence of the Reich.

He was then appointed Jagdfliegerführer Balkan based at Pančevo from June 1944. Falck then became General Flieger-Ausbildung, responsible for all Luftwaffe training schools, shortly after. Falck was a friend of Claus Graf Schenk von Stauffenberg and came under suspicion by the Gestapo after the 20 July Plot.

In March 1945 he was given command of fighters based in the Rhineland, but did not take up the role, becoming a prisoner of the American Forces on 3 May 1945 in Bavaria.

== Post-war career ==
Released in June 1945, Falck had a variety of jobs, including farming, working for a pharmaceutical company, and working for the British Army as a Civil Officer at the stores section of the 47th Royal Engineers. He attended night school and studied business, which resulted in a job selling playing cards. In 1961, he was approached by North American Aviation to undertake an aviation consultancy post. In 1966 he joined McDonnell Douglas. On retirement from business in 1986, he lived in St Ulrich in Austria. He continued flying post war, being a member of many flying clubs.

=== Documentary ===
In 1997, Falck appeared in the last episode of the documentary The Nazis: A Warning from History, named Fighting to the end. Falck was amongst several German war veterans who explained what motivated them to continue fighting late in the war. Falck himself explained the motivations of the Nachtjagdgeschwader (Night Fighter Wings) during the Defence of the Reich campaign. Falck served as president of the German veterans organization Gemeinschaft der Jagdflieger from 18 October 1975 to 8 October 1977.

== Summary of career ==
=== Aerial victory claims ===
Mathews and Foreman, authors of Luftwaffe Aces: Biographies and Victory Claims, researched the German Federal Archives and found records for 7 aerial victory claims, plus one additional unconfirmed claim. This figure includes three claims over Poland and four on the Western Front.

Chronicle of aerial victories
This and the – (dash) indicates unconfirmed aerial victory claims for which Falck did not receive credit.
Claim	Date	Time	Type	Location	Claim	Date	Time	Type	Location
– 2. Staffel of Zerstörergeschwader 76 –
1	5 September 1939	06:40	PZL.23	Dalików	—	18 December 1939	14:45	Wellington	20 km (12 mi) southwest of Heligoland
2	11 September 1939	16:05	F.IX	8 km (5.0 mi) southeast of Biała Podlaska	5	10 January 1940	12:57	Blenheim	northwest of Heligoland
3	11 September 1939	16:10	PWS-26	12 km (7.5 mi) southwest of Biała Podlaska	6	17 February 1940	12:57	Blenheim	north of Ameland
4	18 December 1939	14:40	Wellington	20 km (12 mi) southwest of Heligoland					
– I. Gruppe of Zerstörergeschwader 1 –
7	9 April 1940	12:57	D.XXI	Værløse					

=== Awards ===
- Iron Cross (1939) 2nd and 1st class
- Knight's Cross of the Iron Cross on 1 October 1940 as Major and Geschwaderkommodore of Nachtjagdgeschwader 1

Military offices
Preceded by none	Commander of Nachtjagdgeschwader 1; 26 June 1940 – 1 July 1943	Succeeded by Oberst Werner Streib
Preceded by Oberstleutnant Bernhard Woldenga	Commander of Jagdfliegerführer Rumänien; June 1944 – 7 October 1944	Succeeded by disbanded
