= Małyń =

- Village
- Location within Poland
- Coordinates: 51°47′12″N 19°1′37″E
- Country: Poland
- Voivodeship: Łódź
- County: Poddębice
- Gmina: Zadzim
- Population: 180

Małyń [ˈmawɨɲ] is a village in the administrative district of Gmina Zadzim, within Poddębice County, Łódź Voivodeship, in central Poland.
