= Zaborów =

Zaborów may refer to the following places in Poland:

- Zaborów, Lower Silesian Voivodeship (south-west Poland)
- Zaborów, Piotrków County in Łódź Voivodeship (central Poland)
- Zaborów, Gmina Uniejów in Łódź Voivodeship (central Poland)
- Zaborów, Gmina Zadzim in Łódź Voivodeship (central Poland)
- Zaborów, Lesser Poland Voivodeship (south Poland)
- Zaborów, Subcarpathian Voivodeship (south-east Poland)
- Zaborów, Grójec County in Masovian Voivodeship (east-central Poland)
- Zaborów, Siedlce County in Masovian Voivodeship (east-central Poland)
- Zaborów, Warsaw West County in Masovian Voivodeship (east-central Poland)
