= Psary, Poddębice County =

Psary
- Village
- Location within Poland
- Coordinates: 51°55′47″N 19°6′51″E
- Country: Poland
- Voivodeship: Łódź
- County: Poddębice
- Gmina: Dalików

Psary [ˈpsarɨ] is a village in the administrative district of Gmina Dalików, within Poddębice County, Łódź Voivodeship, in central Poland.
