= Bąki, Łódź Voivodeship =

Bąki
- Village
- Location within Poland
- Coordinates: 51°46′11″N 18°58′38″E
- Country: Poland
- Voivodeship: Łódź
- County: Poddębice
- Gmina: Zadzim
- Population: 61

Bąki [ˈbɔŋki] is a village in the administrative district of Gmina Zadzim, within Poddębice County, Łódź Voivodeship, in central Poland.
