= Głogowiec, Poddębice County =

Głogowiec
- Village
- Location within Poland
- Coordinates: 51°46′41″N 18°53′4″E
- Country: Poland
- Voivodeship: Łódź
- County: Poddębice
- Gmina: Zadzim
- Population: 110

Głogowiec [ɡwɔˈɡɔvjɛt͡s] is a village in the administrative district of Gmina Zadzim, within Poddębice County, Łódź Voivodeship, in central Poland.
