= Pietrachy =

- Village
- Location within Poland
- Coordinates: 51°46′52″N 18°52′24″E
- Country: Poland
- Voivodeship: Łódź
- County: Poddębice
- Gmina: Zadzim

Pietrachy [pjɛˈtraxɨ] is a village in the administrative district of Gmina Zadzim, within Poddębice County, Łódź Voivodeship, in central Poland.
