= Ferdynandów, Poddębice County =

Ferdynandów
- Village
- Location within Poland
- Coordinates: 51°46′17″N 18°43′52″E
- Country: Poland
- Voivodeship: Łódź
- County: Poddębice
- Gmina: Pęczniew

Ferdynandów [fɛrdɨˈnanduf] is a village in the administrative district of Gmina Pęczniew, within Poddębice County, Łódź Voivodeship, in central Poland.
