= Bardzynin =

- Village
- Location within Poland
- Coordinates: 51°54′N 19°10′E
- Country: Poland
- Voivodeship: Łódź
- County: Poddębice
- Gmina: Dalików

Bardzynin [barˈd͡zɨnin] is a village in the administrative district of Gmina Dalików, within Poddębice County, Łódź Voivodeship, in central Poland.
