= Dąbrówka, Poddębice County =

Dąbrówka
- Village
- Location within Poland
- Coordinates: 51°50′29″N 18°52′58″E
- Country: Poland
- Voivodeship: Łódź
- County: Poddębice
- Gmina: Zadzim

Dąbrówka [dɔmˈbrufka] is a village in the administrative district of Gmina Zadzim, within Poddębice County, Łódź Voivodeship, in central Poland.
