= Rudniki, Poddębice County =

Rudniki
- Village
- Location within Poland
- Coordinates: 51°47′49″N 18°45′57″E
- Country: Poland
- Voivodeship: Łódź
- County: Poddębice
- Gmina: Pęczniew

Rudniki [rudˈniki] is a village in the administrative district of Gmina Pęczniew, within Poddębice County, Łódź Voivodeship, in central Poland.
