= Gajówka-Parcel =

Village in Gmina Dalików, Poland

- Village
- Location within Poland
- Coordinates: 51°53′12″N 19°08′04″E
- Country: Poland
- Voivodeship: Łódź
- County: Poddębice
- Gmina: Dalików

Gajówka-Parcel [ɡaˈjufka ˈpart͡sɛl] is a village in the administrative district of Gmina Dalików, within Poddębice County, Łódź Voivodeship, in central Poland.
