= Grabinka, Gmina Zadzim =

Grabinka
- Settlement
- Location within Poland
- Coordinates: 51°46′47″N 18°50′21″E
- Country: Poland
- Voivodeship: Łódź
- County: Poddębice
- Gmina: Zadzim

Grabinka [ɡraˈbinka] is a settlement in the administrative district of Gmina Zadzim, within Poddębice County, Łódź Voivodeship, in central Poland.
