= Szczawno Rzeczyckie =

- Settlement
- Location within Poland
- Coordinates: 51°43′22″N 18°51′35″E
- Country: Poland
- Voivodeship: Łódź
- County: Poddębice
- Gmina: Zadzim

Szczawno Rzeczyckie [ˈʂt͡ʂavnɔ ʐɛˈt͡ʂɨt͡skʲɛ] is a settlement in the administrative district of Gmina Zadzim, within Poddębice County, Łódź Voivodeship, in central Poland.
