= Złotniki, Poddębice County =

Złotniki
- Village
- Location within Poland
- Coordinates: 51°52′24″N 19°4′11″E
- Country: Poland
- Voivodeship: Łódź
- County: Poddębice
- Gmina: Dalików

Złotniki [zwɔtˈniki] is a village in the administrative district of Gmina Dalików, within Poddębice County, Łódź Voivodeship, in central Poland.
