= Dybów =

Dybów may refer to the following places:

- Dybów, Łódź Voivodeship (central Poland)
- Dybów, Lubusz Voivodeship (west Poland)
- Dybów, Masovian Voivodeship (east-central Poland)
