= Budzynek =

- Village
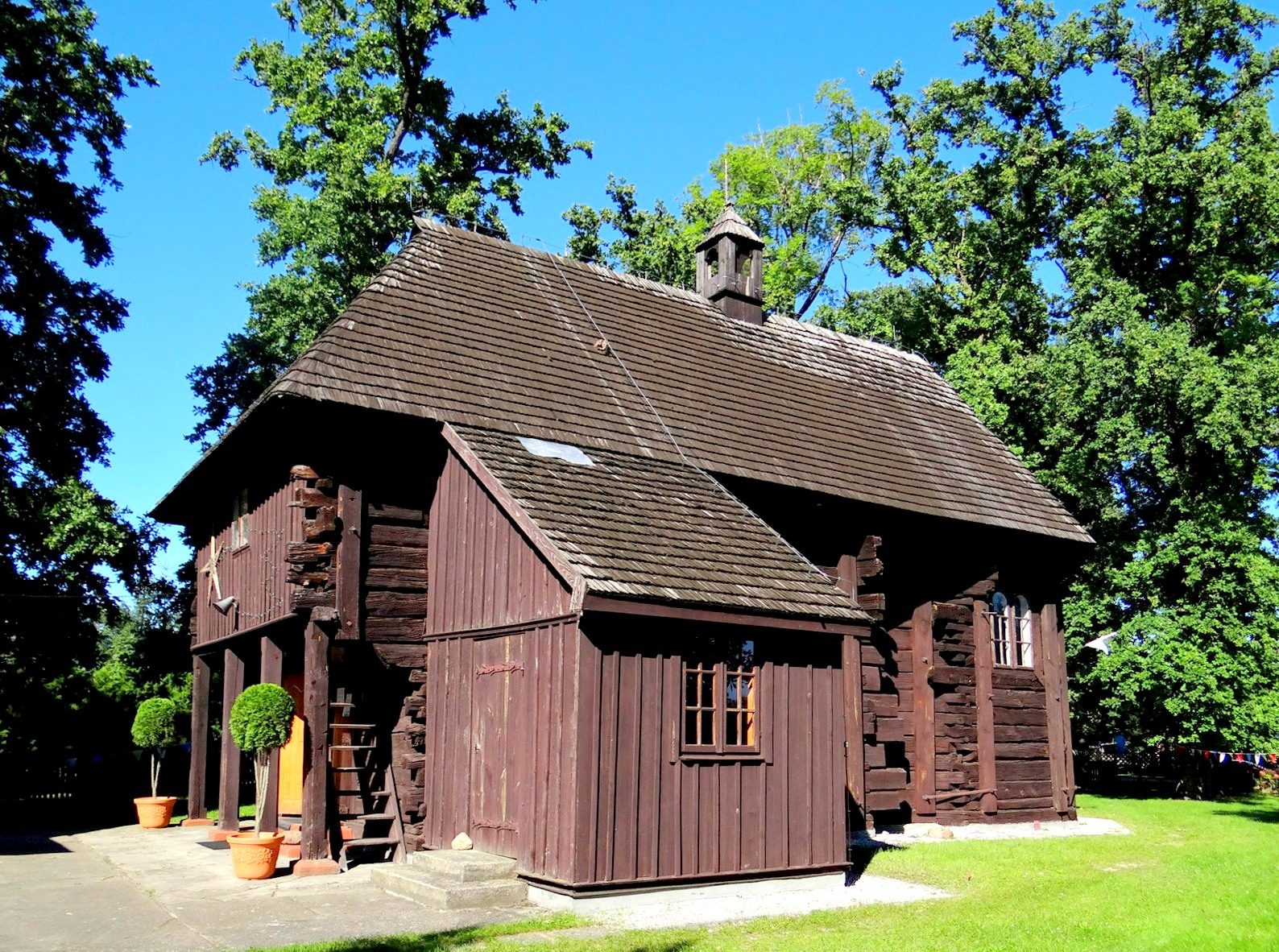
- Saint John the Baptist church in Budzynek

- Location within Poland
- Coordinates: 51°56′N 19°8′E
- Country: Poland
- Voivodeship: Łódź
- County: Poddębice
- Gmina: Dalików

Population
  - Total: 140
- Time zone: UTC+1 (CET)
  - Summer (DST): UTC+2 (CEST)
- Vehicle registration: EPD

Budzynek [buˈd͡zɨnɛk] is a village in the administrative district of Gmina Dalików, within Poddębice County, Łódź Voivodeship, in central Poland. It is located in Łęczyca Land.

It was a private town, administratively located in the Łęczyca County in the Łęczyca Voivodeship in the Greater Poland Province of the Kingdom of Poland.
