= Kontrewers =

Kontrewers may refer to the following places:

- Kontrewers, Łódź Voivodeship (central Poland)
- Kontrewers, Masovian Voivodeship (east-central Poland)
- Kontrewers, Świętokrzyskie Voivodeship (south-central Poland)
