= Babiniec, Łódź Voivodeship =

Babiniec
- Settlement
- Location within Poland
- Coordinates: 51°47′58″N 18°56′20″E
- Country: Poland
- Voivodeship: Łódź
- County: Poddębice
- Gmina: Zadzim
- Population: 66

Babiniec [baˈbiɲɛt͡s] is a settlement of przysiółek type in the administrative district of Gmina Zadzim, within Poddębice County, Łódź Voivodeship, in central Poland.
