= Osowiec, Łódź Voivodeship =

Osowiec
- Village
- Location within Poland
- Coordinates: 51°45′43″N 18°46′9″E
- Country: Poland
- Voivodeship: Łódź
- County: Poddębice
- Gmina: Pęczniew

Osowiec [ɔˈsɔvjɛt͡s] is a village in the administrative district of Gmina Pęczniew, within Poddębice County, Łódź Voivodeship, in central Poland.
