= Chodaki, Łódź Voivodeship =

Chodaki
- Village
- Location within Poland
- Coordinates: 51°47′30″N 18°55′25″E
- Country: Poland
- Voivodeship: Łódź
- County: Poddębice
- Gmina: Zadzim

Chodaki [xɔˈdaki] is a village in the administrative district of Gmina Zadzim, within Poddębice County, Łódź Voivodeship, in central Poland.
