= Księże Młyny =

- Village
- Location within Poland
- Coordinates: 51°52′53″N 18°44′16″E
- Country: Poland
- Voivodeship: Łódź
- County: Poddębice
- Gmina: Pęczniew

Księże Młyny [ˈkɕɛ̃ʐɛ ˈmwɨnɨ] is a village in the administrative district of Gmina Pęczniew, within Poddębice County, Łódź Voivodeship, in central Poland.
