= Przywidz, Łódź Voivodeship =

Przywidz
- Village
- Location within Poland
- Coordinates: 51°46′49″N 18°48′20″E
- Country: Poland
- Voivodeship: Łódź
- County: Poddębice
- Gmina: Pęczniew

Przywidz [ˈpʂɨvit͡s] is a village in the administrative district of Gmina Pęczniew, within Poddębice County, Łódź Voivodeship, in central Poland.
