= Piła, Łódź Voivodeship =

Piła
- Village
- Location within Poland
- Coordinates: 51°44′53″N 18°48′2″E
- Country: Poland
- Voivodeship: Łódź
- County: Poddębice
- Gmina: Zadzim
- Population: 30

Piła [ˈpiwa] is a village in the administrative district of Gmina Zadzim, within Poddębice County, Łódź Voivodeship, in central Poland.
