= Pęczniew =

- Village
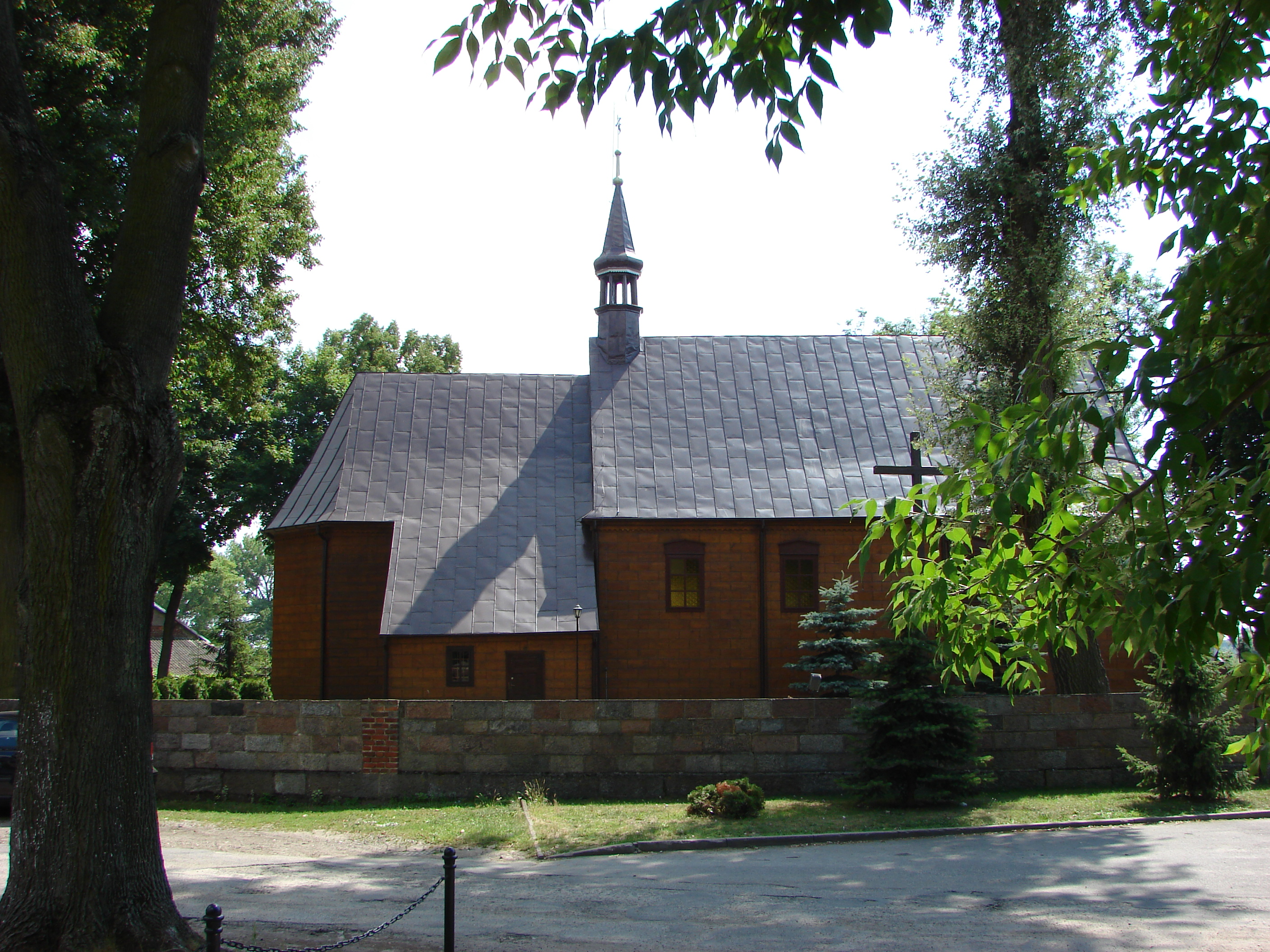
- St. Catherine wooden church from 1784

- Location within Poland
- Coordinates: 51°48′N 18°44′E
- Country: Poland
- Voivodeship: Łódź
- County: Poddębice
- Gmina: Pęczniew
- Population: 830

Pęczniew [ˈpɛnt͡ʂɲɛf] is a village in Poddębice County, Łódź Voivodeship, in central Poland. It is the seat of the gmina (administrative district) called Gmina Pęczniew.
