= Domaniewek, Łódź Voivodeship =

Domaniewek
- Village
- Location within Poland
- Coordinates: 51°56′2″N 19°5′29″E
- Country: Poland
- Voivodeship: Łódź
- County: Poddębice
- Gmina: Dalików

Domaniewek [dɔmaˈɲɛvɛk] is a village in the administrative district of Gmina Dalików, within Poddębice County, Łódź Voivodeship, in central Poland.
