= Zadzim =

- Village
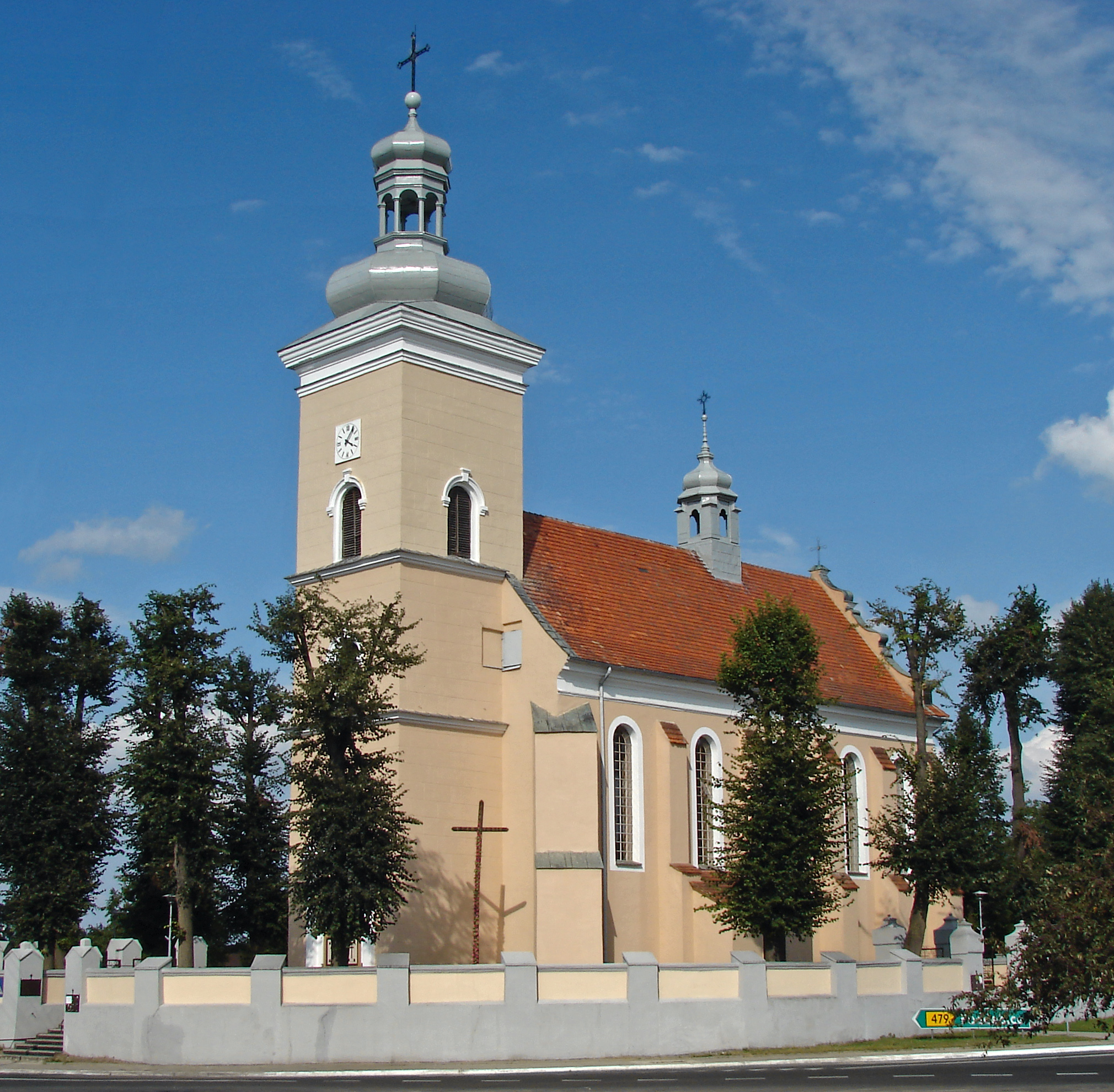
- Church of St Margaret in Zadzim

- Location within Poland
- Coordinates: 51°47′N 18°51′E
- Country: Poland
- Voivodeship: Łódź
- County: Poddębice
- Gmina: Zadzim

Zadzim [ˈzad͡ʑim] is a village in Poddębice County, Łódź Voivodeship, in central Poland. It is the seat of the gmina (administrative district) called Gmina Zadzim.

== History ==
The first written mention of Zadzim comes from 1386. It was the home of Zadzimski family, who erected a church in the village somewhere around the early 15th century. Later, the settlement belonged also to Zaleski family from Otok, and the families of Radomicki, Sapieha, and Lubomirski. In the 16th century it was divided in three smaller and separate settlements called Wola Zaleska, Wola Sypińska and Wola Zadzimska (currently Wola Flaszczyna). In the 18th century, the estates were purchased by Dąmbski family from Lubraniec. Count Józef Kazimierz from Lubraniec was a voivode of Sieradz in 1756–1766. For the last time before the dissolution of the Polish state, the village was bought by the Jarociński family. In the centre of Zadzim stands the late Renaissance Church of St Margaret (pw. św. Małgorzaty) built of brick in 1640–1642 in place of the original wooden church from 1416. The founder and main benefactor of the present structure was Count Aleksander Zaleski from Otok, Dołęga coat of arms.

== Notable people ==
Zadzim is the birthplace of Jewish painter Leopold Pilichowski (1869–1934), student of Jan Matejko, who was active during the final years of the foreign partitions of Poland.
