= Kontrewers, Łódź Voivodeship =

Kontrewers
- Village
- Location within Poland
- Coordinates: 51°49′58″N 19°6′20″E
- Country: Poland
- Voivodeship: Łódź
- County: Poddębice
- Gmina: Dalików

Kontrewers [kɔnˈtrɛvɛrs] is a village in the administrative district of Gmina Dalików, within Poddębice County, Łódź Voivodeship, in central Poland.
