= Gmina Pęczniew =

Gmina Pęczniew Pęczniew Commune
- Gmina
- Interactive map of Gmina Pęczniew
- Coordinates (Pęczniew): 51°48′N 18°44′E
- Country: Poland
- Voivodeship: Łódź
- County: Poddębice
- Seat: Pęczniew

Area
  - Total: 128.38 km^{2} (49.57 sq mi)

Population (2006)
  - Total: 3,672
  - Density: 28.60/km^{2} (74.08/sq mi)

Gmina Pęczniew is a rural gmina (administrative district) in Poddębice County, Łódź Voivodeship, in central Poland. Its seat is the village of Pęczniew, which lies approximately 20 kilometres (12 mi) south-west of Poddębice and 51 km (32 mi) west of the regional capital Łódź.

The gmina covers an area of 128.38 square kilometres (49.6 sq mi), and as of 2006 its total population is 3,672.

== Villages ==
Gmina Pęczniew contains the villages and settlements of Borki Drużbińskie, Brodnia, Brodnia-Kolonia, Brzeg, Drużbin, Dybów, Ferdynandów, Jadwichna, Kraczynki, Księża Wólka, Księże Młyny, Lubola, Łyszkowice, Osowiec, Pęczniew, Popów, Przywidz, Rudniki, Siedlątków, Wola Pomianowa and Zagórki.

== Neighbouring gminas ==
Gmina Pęczniew is bordered by the gminas of Dobra, Poddębice, Warta and Zadzim.
