= Bogucice, Łódź Voivodeship =

Bogucice
- Village
- Location within Poland
- Coordinates: 51°45′14″N 18°57′40″E
- Country: Poland
- Voivodeship: Łódź
- County: Poddębice
- Gmina: Zadzim
- Population: 109

Bogucice [bɔɡuˈt͡ɕit͡sɛ] is a village in the administrative district of Gmina Zadzim, within Poddębice County, Łódź Voivodeship, in central Poland.
