= Zagórki, Łódź Voivodeship =

Zagórki
- Village
- Location within Poland
- Coordinates: 51°46′4″N 18°41′20″E
- Country: Poland
- Voivodeship: Łódź
- County: Poddębice
- Gmina: Pęczniew

Zagórki [zaˈɡurki] is a village in the administrative district of Gmina Pęczniew, within Poddębice County, Łódź Voivodeship, in central Poland.
