= Jeżew =

- Village
- Location within Poland
- Coordinates: 51°47′54″N 19°0′16″E
- Country: Poland
- Voivodeship: Łódź
- County: Poddębice
- Gmina: Zadzim

Jeżew [ˈjɛʐɛf] is a village in the administrative district of Gmina Zadzim, within Poddębice County, Łódź Voivodeship, in central Poland.
