= Zaborów, Gmina Zadzim =

Zaborów
- Settlement
- Location within Poland
- Coordinates: 51°46′1″N 18°57′36″E
- Country: Poland
- Voivodeship: Łódź
- County: Poddębice
- Gmina: Zadzim

Zaborów [zaˈbɔruf] is a settlement in the administrative district of Gmina Zadzim, within Poddębice County, Łódź Voivodeship, in central Poland.
