= Hilarów, Łódź Voivodeship =

Hilarów
- Settlement
- Location within Poland
- Coordinates: 51°47′48″N 18°48′43″E
- Country: Poland
- Voivodeship: Łódź
- County: Poddębice
- Gmina: Zadzim

Hilarów [xiˈlaruf] is a settlement in the administrative district of Gmina Zadzim, within Poddębice County, Łódź Voivodeship, in central Poland.
