= Żerniki, Łódź Voivodeship =

Żerniki
- Village
- Location within Poland
- Coordinates: 51°48′47″N 18°55′29″E
- Country: Poland
- Voivodeship: Łódź
- County: Poddębice
- Gmina: Zadzim

Żerniki (Polish pronunciation: [ʐɛrˈɲikʲi]) is a village in the administrative district of Gmina Zadzim, within Poddębice County, Łódź Voivodeship, in central Poland.
