= Dalików =

- Village
- Location within Poland
- Coordinates: 51°52′55″N 19°6′13″E
- Country: Poland
- Voivodeship: Łódź
- County: Poddębice
- Gmina: Dalików
- Population: 410

Dalików [daˈlikuf] is a village in Poddębice County, Łódź Voivodeship, in central Poland. It is the seat of the gmina (administrative district) called Gmina Dalików.
