= Poddębice =

Town in Łódź Voivodeship, Poland

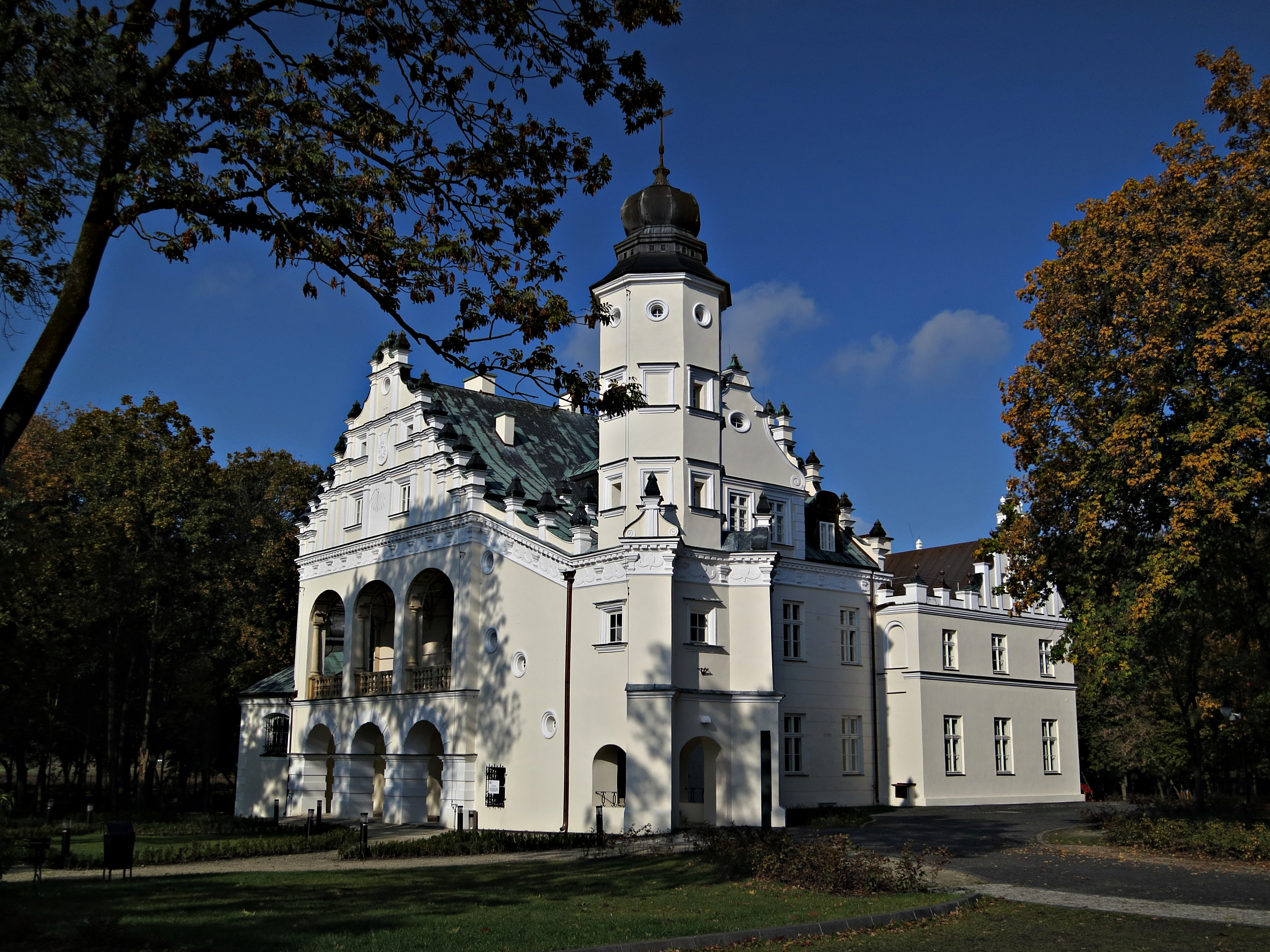
- Poddębice Palace

- Coat of arms

- Location within Poland
- Coordinates: 51°54′N 18°58′E
- Country: Poland
- Voivodeship: Łódź
- County: Poddębice
- Gmina: Poddębice

Government
  - Mayor: Piotr Sęczkowski

Area
  - Total: 5.89 km^{2} (2.27 sq mi)

Population (31 December 2020)
  - Total: 7,245 ▼
  - Density: 1,230/km^{2} (3,190/sq mi)
- Time zone: UTC+1 (CET)
  - Summer (DST): UTC+2 (CEST)
- Postal code: 99-200
- Car plates: EPD
- Website: http://www.poddebice.pl

Poddębice [pɔdːɛmˈbʲit͡sɛ] is a town in central Poland, in Łódź Voivodeship. It is the capital of Poddębice County. It lies approximately 40 km (25 mi) northwest of Łódź. Population is 7,245 (2020). It is located within the historic Łęczyca Land.

== History ==
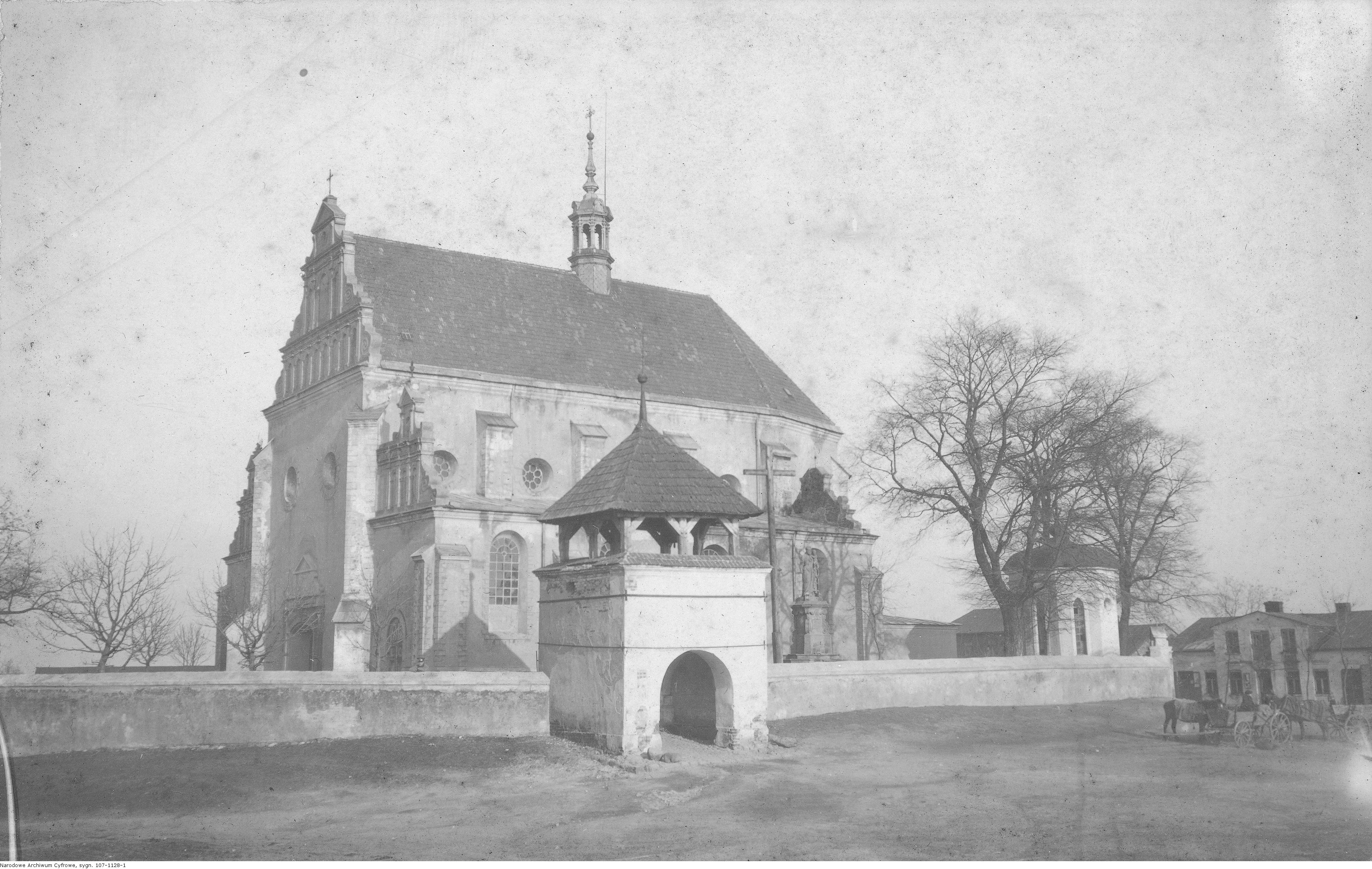
Saint Catherine church in 1916

Poddębice was a private town, administratively located in the Łęczyca County in the Łęczyca Voivodeship in the Greater Poland Province of the Kingdom of Poland. Zygmunt Grudziński built a Renaissance palace in the town.

In the interwar period, it was administratively located in the Łódź Voivodeship of Poland. According to the 1921 census, the population was 61.4% Polish and 37.0% Jewish.

=== World War II ===
During the German occupation of Poland (World War II), in 1940, the occupiers carried out expulsions of Poles, mostly owners of shops, workshops and better houses, which were then handed over to German colonists as part of the Lebensraum policy. Several Poles, who were either born or lived and worked in Poddębice, were murdered by the Russians in the Katyn massacre in 1940.

The local Jewish population, which numbered around 1,400 at the start of the war, was confined to a ghetto and subject to forced labor. In 1942, five were hung publicly and in April, 1,800 Jews, including several hundred forcibly resettled from Łęczyca, were confined in a church for ten days without any essentials, including food until a bribe was paid. Ten died there. After a few days, the sick and the elderly were then murdered nearby. After ten days, some skilled workers were sent to the Łódź Ghetto. All the remainder were sent to the Chełmno extermination camp where they were immediately gassed. Few of Poddębice's Jews survived the war. The German administrator of Poddębice (probably Franz Heinrich Bock) kept a secret diary published after the war. His diary was critical of the anti-Jewish policies. He had tried to help the Jewish population when he could. He was removed from his post during the war.

== Demographics ==
Historical population

Year	Pop.	±%
1890	3,094	—
1897	2,724	−12.0%
1910	2,834	+4.0%
1921	3,122	+10.2%
1931	3,800	+21.7%

Year	Pop.	±%
1939	4,305	+13.3%
1950	2,539	−41.0%
1960	3,262	+28.5%
2010	7,781	+138.5%

== Transport ==
Poddębice lies on the intersection of national road 72 and vovoideship road 703.

National road 72 connects Poddębice to Konin to the west and to Łódź to the east.

Vovoideship road 703 connects Poddębice to Łęczyca.

The A2 motorway passes to the north of Poddębice. The Wartkowice exit of the motorway provides for quick access to Łódź and Poznań.

The nearest railway station is in Łęczyca.

== Sports ==
The local football club is Ner Poddębice. It competes in the lower leagues.
