= Poddębice County =

Poddębice County Powiat poddębicki
- County
- Flag Coat of arms

- Location within the voivodeship
- Coordinates (Poddębice): 51°54′N 18°58′E
- Country: Poland
- Voivodeship: Łódź
- Seat: Poddębice
- Gminas: Total 6: Gmina Dalików; Gmina Pęczniew; Gmina Poddębice; Gmina Uniejów; Gmina Wartkowice; Gmina Zadzim

Area
  - Total: 880.91 km^{2} (340.12 sq mi)

Population (2006)
  - Total: 42,195
  - Density: 47.899/km^{2} (124.06/sq mi)
  - Urban: 10,791
  - Rural: 31,404
- Car plates: EPD
- Website: www.poddebicki.pl

Poddębice County (Polish: powiat poddębicki) is a unit of territorial administration and local government (powiat) in Łódź Voivodeship, central Poland. It came into being on January 1, 1999, as a result of the Polish local government reforms passed in 1998. Its administrative seat and largest town is Poddębice, which lies 37 kilometres (23 mi) west of the regional capital Łódź. The only other town in the county is Uniejów, lying 14 km (9 mi) north-west of Poddębice.

The county covers an area of 880.91 square kilometres (340.1 sq mi). As of 2006 its total population is 42,195, out of which the population of Poddębice is 7,875, that of Uniejów is 2,916, and the rural population is 31,404.

== Neighbouring counties ==
Poddębice County is bordered by Łęczyca County to the north-east, Zgierz County to the east, Pabianice County to the south-east, Łask County, Zduńska Wola County and Sieradz County to the south, Turek County to the west, and Koło County to the north-west.

== Administrative divisions ==
The county is subdivided into six gminas (two urban-rural and four rural). These are listed in the following table, in descending order of population.

| Gmina | Type | Area (km^{2}) | Population (2006) | Seat |
|---|---|---|---|---|
| Gmina Poddębice | urban-rural | 224.7 | 15,923 | Poddębice |
| Gmina Uniejów | urban-rural | 129.0 | 7,249 | Uniejów |
| Gmina Wartkowice | rural | 141.8 | 6,360 | Wartkowice |
| Gmina Zadzim | rural | 144.4 | 5,341 | Zadzim |
| Gmina Pęczniew | rural | 128.4 | 3,672 | Pęczniew |
| Gmina Dalików | rural | 112.7 | 3,650 | Dalików |
