= Mszczonów County =

County in Sochaczew Land

Mszczonów County Powiat mszczonowski (Polish)
- County of Rawa Voivodeship
- ?–1793
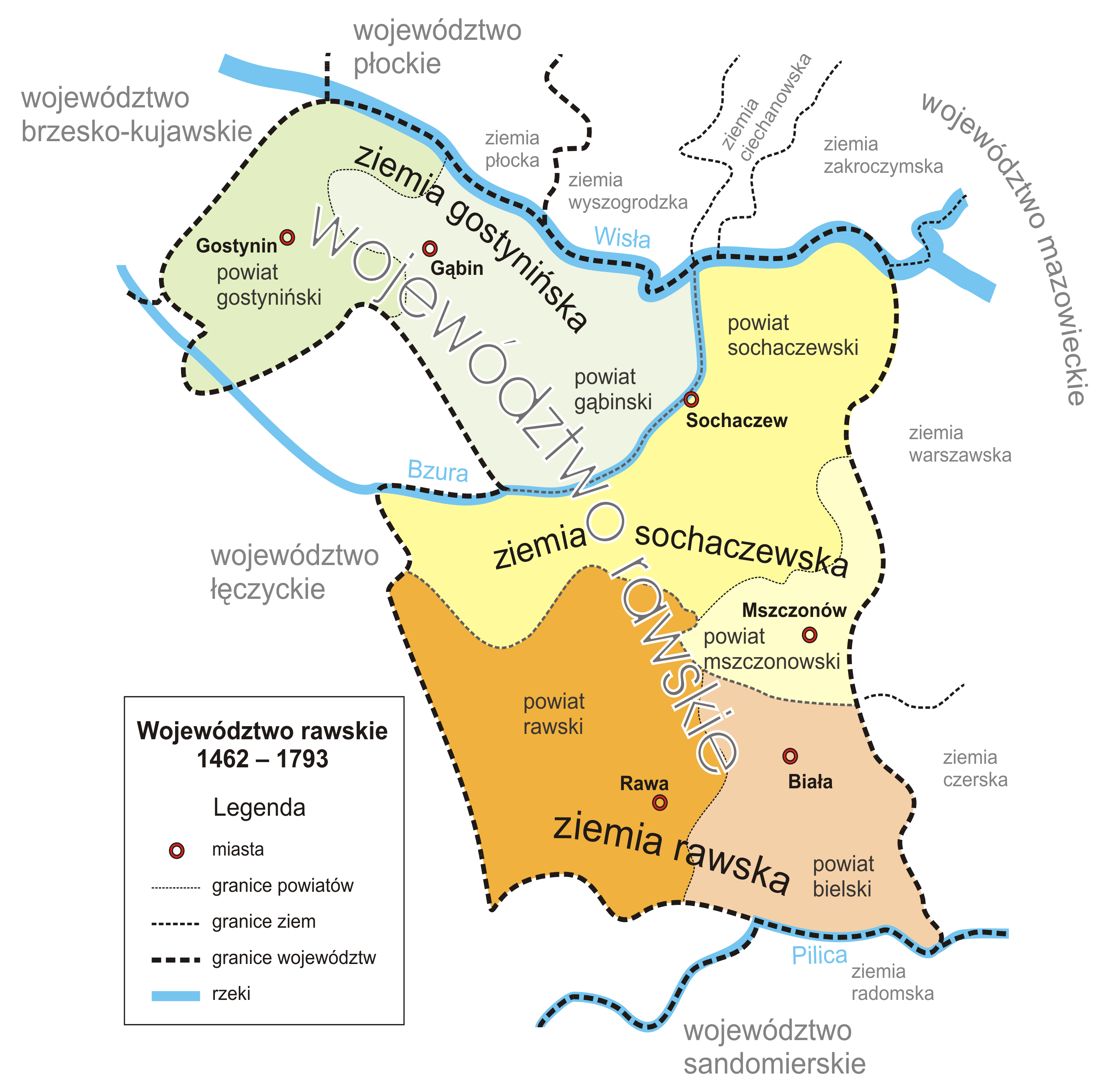
- Map of subdivisions of Rawa Voivodeship.
- Capital: Mszczonów
- History
  - Established: ?
  - Disestablished: 1793
- Contained within
  - Country: Polish–Lithuanian Commonwealth
  - Union memberstate: Crown of the Kingdom of Poland
  - Province: Greater Poland
  - Voivodeship: Rawa
  - Land: Sochaczew
Succeeded by
South Prussia

Mszczonów County (Note: Polish: Powiat mszczonowski) was a county of the Sochaczew Land, Rawa Voivodeship located within the Greater Poland Province of the Crown of the Kingdom of Poland, Polish–Lithuanian Commonwealth. Its capital was Mszczonów.
