= Wierzbówka =

Wierzbówka may refer to:

- Wierzbówka, Lublin Voivodeship (east Poland)
- Wierzbówka, Łódź Voivodeship (central Poland)

== See also ==
- Wierzbowa (disambiguation)
