= Mieczysław Zdzienicki =

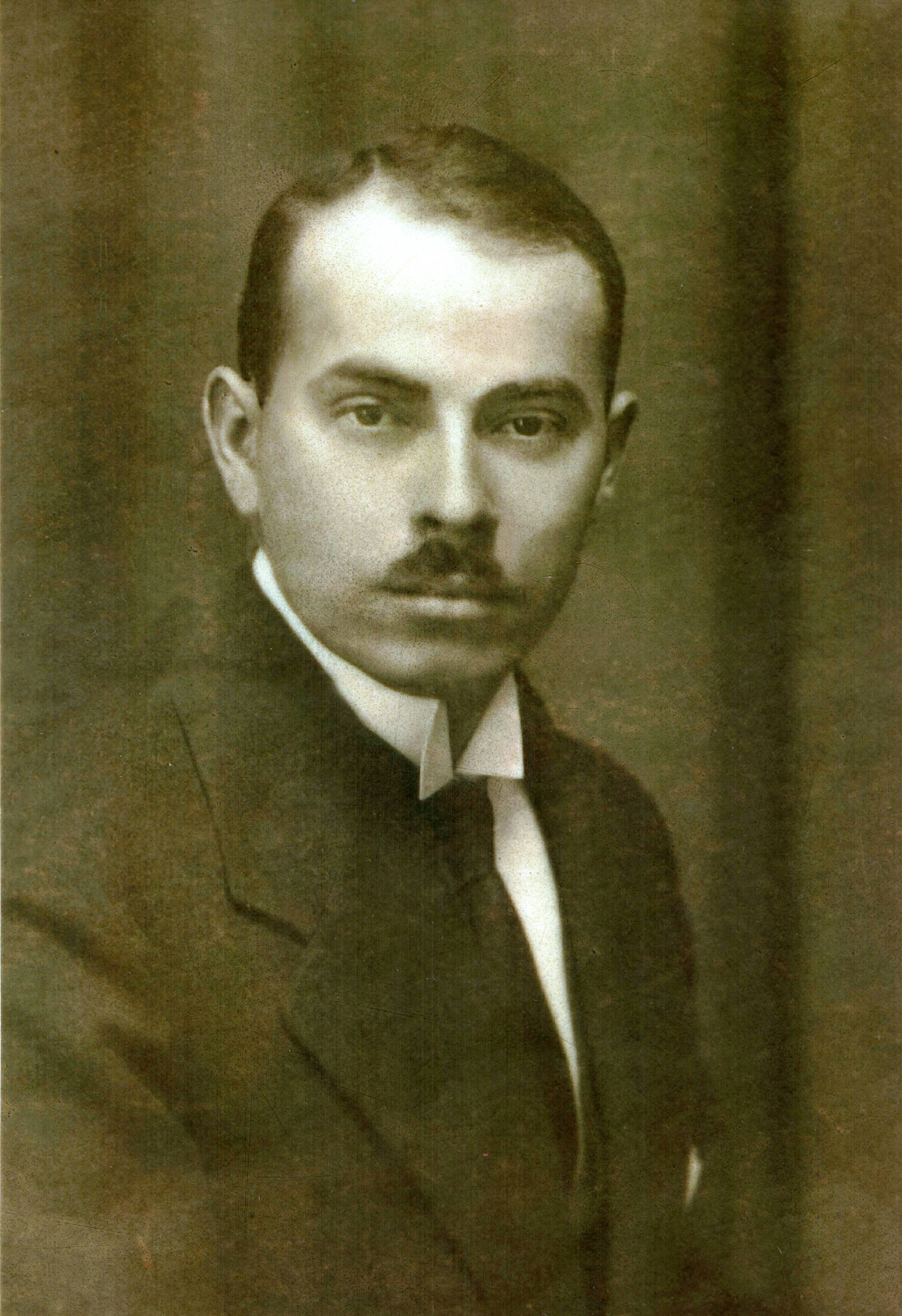
Mieczysław Zdzienicki

Mieczysław Zdzienicki, Siekiel-Zdzienicki (15 February 1892 – 16 October 1953) was a Polish social activist, lawyer and bibliophile. He was the President of "Friends Book Society" in Kalisz.

== Biography ==
Zdzienicki was born on 15 February 1892 in Mszczonów. He was one of leading personalities in local "Towarzystwa Przyjaciół Książki" (Friends Book Society) in Kalisz. Zdzienicki, which developed a logo of a "Friends Book Society" in Kalisz. Zdzienicki was a President – from the day of initiation in October 1927 to 1936, when the activities of the society slowed after deaths of several active members (Felicji Łączkowskiej, Alfonsa Parczewskiego, Mieczysława Krauckiego). In 1928 Mieczysław Zdzienicki became a member of the Supreme Bibliophile Council established three years earlier in Kraków.

In professional life Zdzienicki was a prominent lawyer in Warsaw than in Kalisz. He was on the board of directors of the society public library "Adam Mickiewicz" in Kalisz.

In June 1939 he was elected to City Council as the candidate of the National-Catholic party.

Mieczysław Zdzienicki developed Registry of noble families in Grójec County (Kalisz, 1937).

After the outbreak of World War II he carried out genealogical research and worked on a book relating to St. Wojciech (which he did not complete).

He died on 16 October 1953 in Starzyny. The tomb of Mieczysław Zdzienicki and his wife Jadwiga (Karpińska) is located at the cemetery in Wartkowice near Leczyce.

== Sources ==
- Ewa Andrysiak, Mieczysław Siekiel-Zdzienicki, w: Słownik pracowników książki polskiej, Suplement II (pod redakcją Hanny Tadeusiewicz z udziałem Bogumiła Karkowskiego), Wydawnictwo Stowarzyszenia Bibliotekarzy Polskich, Warszawa 2000, s. 186 (in Polish)
- Ewa Andrysiak, Mieczysław Siekiel-Zdzienicki, w: Słownik biograficzny Wielkopolski południowo-wschodniej Ziemi Kaliskiej (pod redakcją Hanny Tadeusiewicz), tom I, Kaliskie Towarzystwo Przyjaciół Nauk, Kalisz 1998, s. 305 (in Polish)
- Ewa Andrysiak, Kaliscy bibliofile w międzywojniu (available: 21 listopada 2008) (in Polish)
