= Gostków =

Gostków may refer to the following places in Poland:

- Gostków, Lower Silesian Voivodeship (south-west Poland)
- Gostków, Świętokrzyskie Voivodeship (south-central Poland)
- Nowy Gostków, a village in Gmina Wartkowice, Poddębice County, Łódź Voivodeship
- Stary Gostków, a village in Gmina Wartkowice, Poddębice County, Łódź Voivodeship
