= Jadwisin =

Jadwisin may refer to the following places in Poland:

- Jadwisin, Lower Silesian Voivodeship (south-west Poland)
- Jadwisin, Łódź Voivodeship (central Poland)
- Jadwisin, Łuków County in Lublin Voivodeship (east Poland)
- Jadwisin, Świdnik County in Lublin Voivodeship (east Poland)
- Jadwisin, Legionowo County in Masovian Voivodeship (east-central Poland)
- Jadwisin, Sokołów County in Masovian Voivodeship (east-central Poland)
- Jadwisin, Warsaw, a neighbourhood of Warsaw, Masovian Voivodeship (east-central Poland)
- Jadwisin, Wołomin County in Masovian Voivodeship (east-central Poland)
