= Gmina Wartkowice =

Gmina Wartkowice Wartkowice Commune
- Gmina
- Coat of arms
- Interactive map of Gmina Wartkowice
- Coordinates (Wartkowice): 51°59′N 19°1′E
- Country: Poland
- Voivodeship: Łódź
- County: Poddębice
- Seat: Stary Gostków

Area
  - Total: 141.8 km^{2} (54.7 sq mi)

Population (2006)
  - Total: 6,360
  - Density: 44.9/km^{2} (116/sq mi)

Gmina Wartkowice is a rural gmina (administrative district) in Poddębice County, Łódź Voivodeship, in central Poland. Its seat is the village of Stary Gostków, which lies approximately 10 kilometres (6 mi) north of Poddębice and 39 km (24 mi) north-west of the regional capital Łódź.

The gmina covers an area of 141.8 square kilometres (54.7 sq mi), and as of 2006 its total population is 6,360.

== Villages ==
Gmina Wartkowice contains the villages and settlements of Biała Góra, Biernacice, Borek, Bronów, Bronówek, Brudnówek, Chodów, Drwalew, Dzierżawy, Grabiszew, Jadwisin, Kiki, Kłódno, Konopnica, Krzepocinek, Łążki, Lewiny, Mrówna, Nasale, Ner, Nowa Wieś, Nowy Gostków, Orzeszków, Parądzice, Pauzew, Pełczyska, Plewnik Drugi, Plewnik Pierwszy, Polesie, Powodów Drugi, Powodów Pierwszy, Powodów Trzeci, Saków, Sędów, Spędoszyn, Spędoszyn-Kolonia, Stary Gostków, Starzyny, Sucha Dolna, Sucha Górna, Światonia, Truskawiec, Tur, Ujazd, Wartkowice, Wierzbowa, Wierzbówka, Wilkowice, Wola Niedźwiedzia, Wola-Dąbrowa, Wólka, Wólki, Zacisze, Zalesie, Zawada and Zelgoszcz.

== Neighbouring gminas ==
Gmina Wartkowice is bordered by the gminas of Dalików, Łęczyca, Parzęczew, Poddębice, Świnice Warckie and Uniejów.
