= Pelczar =

Pelczar is a surname. Notable people with the surname include:

- Józef Sebastian Pelczar (1842–1924), Polish Roman Catholic bishop
- Kazimierz Pelczar (1894–1943), Polish academic and physician
