= Klodno =

Klodno may refer to the following places in Poland:

- Kłodno, Pomeranian Voivodeship
- Kłodno, West Pomeranian Voivodeship
- Kłódno, Łódź Voivodeship
