= Pełczyska =

Pełczyska may refer to the following places:

- Pełczyska, Łódź Voivodeship (central Poland)
- Pełczyska, Zgierz County in Łódź Voivodeship (central Poland)
- Pełczyska, Świętokrzyskie Voivodeship (south-central Poland)
