= Truskawiec =

Truskawiec may refer to:

- Truskavets, Ukraine - Truskawiec in Polish
- Truskawiec, Łódź Voivodeship (central Poland)
