= Biernacice =

Biernacice may refer to the following places in Poland:

- Biernacice, Lower Silesian Voivodeship (south-west Poland)
- Biernacice, Łódź Voivodeship (central Poland)
- Biernacice, Greater Poland Voivodeship (west-central Poland)
