= Sucha Dolna =

Sucha Dolna may refer to:

- Polish name for Dolní Suchá in the Czech Republic
- Sucha Dolna, Łódź Voivodeship (central Poland)
- Sucha Dolna, Lubusz Voivodeship (west Poland)
