= Chodów =

Chodów may refer to the following places:

- Chodów, Lesser Poland Voivodeship (south Poland)
- Chodów, Łódź Voivodeship (central Poland)
- Chodów, Masovian Voivodeship (east-central Poland)
- Chodów, Greater Poland Voivodeship (west-central Poland)
