= Borek, Poddębice County =

Borek
- Village
- Location within Poland
- Coordinates: 52°00′39″N 19°00′50″E
- Country: Poland
- Voivodeship: Łódź
- County: Poddębice
- Gmina: Wartkowice

Borek [ˈbɔrɛk] is a village in the administrative district of Gmina Wartkowice, within Poddębice County, Łódź Voivodeship, in central Poland.
