= Wólki, Łódź Voivodeship =

Wólki
- Village
- Location within Poland
- Coordinates: 51°59′20″N 18°56′2″E
- Country: Poland
- Voivodeship: Łódź
- County: Poddębice
- Gmina: Wartkowice

Wólki [ˈvulki] is a village in the administrative district of Gmina Wartkowice, within Poddębice County, Łódź Voivodeship, in central Poland.
