= Nowa Wieś, Gmina Wartkowice =

Nowa Wieś
- Village
- Location within Poland
- Coordinates: 51°56′2″N 19°0′36″E
- Country: Poland
- Voivodeship: Łódź
- County: Poddębice
- Gmina: Wartkowice

Nowa Wieś [ˈnɔva ˈvjɛɕ] is a village in the administrative district of Gmina Wartkowice, within Poddębice County, Łódź Voivodeship, in central Poland.
