= Bronówek, Łódź Voivodeship =

Bronówek
- Village
- Location within Poland
- Coordinates: 51°58′12″N 18°53′12″E
- Country: Poland
- Voivodeship: Łódź
- County: Poddębice
- Gmina: Wartkowice

Bronówek [brɔˈnuvɛk] is a village in the administrative district of Gmina Wartkowice, within Poddębice County, Łódź Voivodeship, in central Poland.
