= Dzierżawy =

- Village
- Location within Poland
- Coordinates: 52°0′N 18°59′E
- Country: Poland
- Voivodeship: Łódź
- County: Poddębice
- Gmina: Wartkowice

Dzierżawy [d͡ʑɛrˈʐavɨ] is a village in the administrative district of Gmina Wartkowice, within Poddębice County, Łódź Voivodeship, in central Poland.
