= Grabiszew, Poddębice County =

Grabiszew
- Village
- Location within Poland
- Coordinates: 52°0′17″N 18°55′35″E
- Country: Poland
- Voivodeship: Łódź
- County: Poddębice
- Gmina: Wartkowice

Grabiszew [ɡraˈbiʂɛf] is a village in the administrative district of Gmina Wartkowice, within Poddębice County, Łódź Voivodeship, in central Poland.
