= Osmolin Radio Tower =

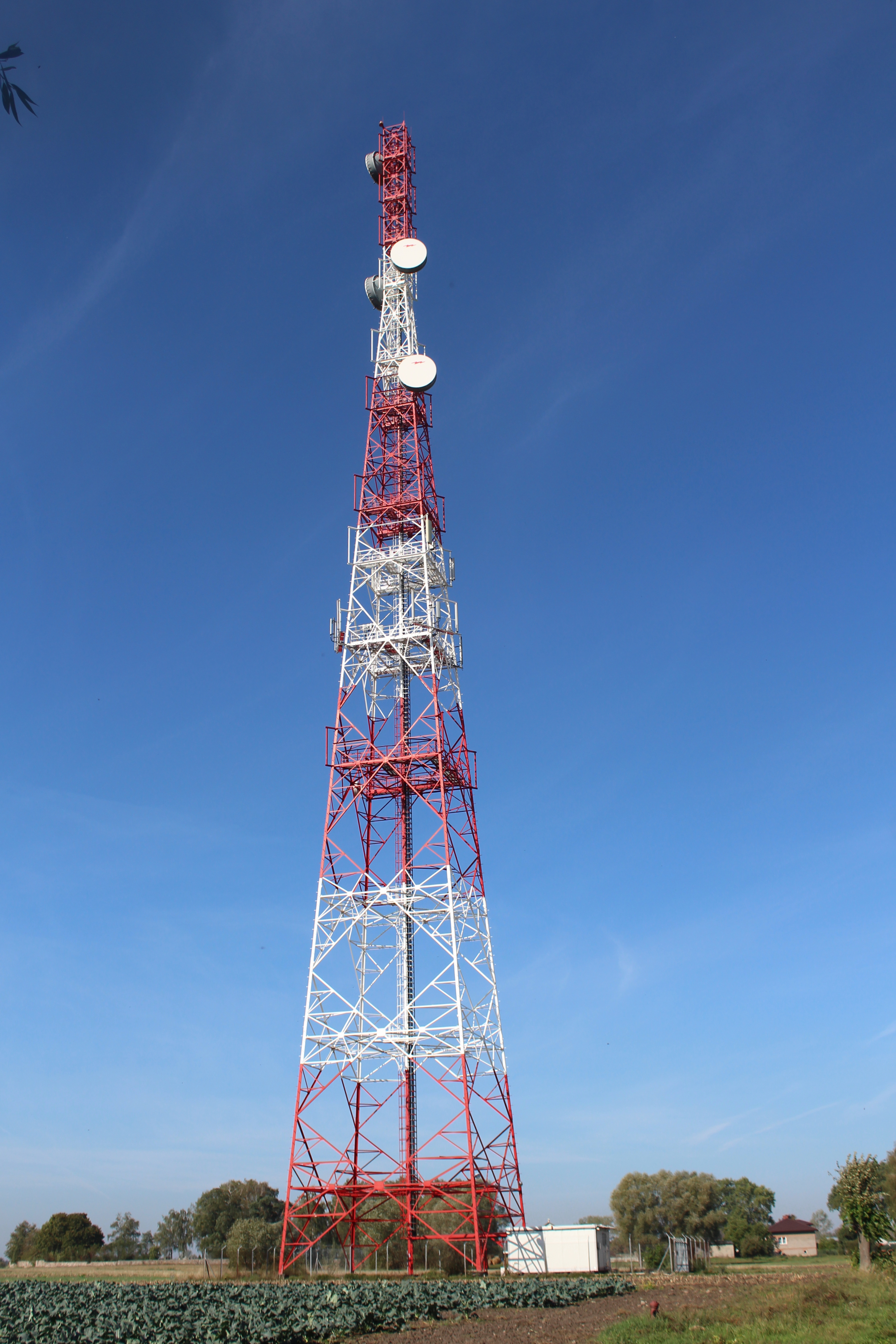
- Location: Osmolin, Poland
- Tower height: 100 m (330 ft)
- Coordinates: 52°18′01″N 19°49′55″E

Osmolin Radio Tower ( Polish: SLR Osmolin) is a 100-metre-tall (330 ft) radio tower built of lattice steel at Osmolin, Poland at 52°18′01″N 19°49′55″E. The Osmolin Radio Tower is used for directional radio services.

== See also ==
- List of towers
