= Wólka, Gmina Wartkowice =

Wólka
- Village
- Location within Poland
- Coordinates: 51°59′4″N 19°1′57″E
- Country: Poland
- Voivodeship: Łódź
- County: Poddębice
- Gmina: Wartkowice

Wólka [ˈvulka] is a village in the administrative district of Gmina Wartkowice, within Poddębice County, Łódź Voivodeship, in central Poland.
