= Łążki =

- Village
- Location within Poland
- Coordinates: 51°57′50″N 19°08′12″E
- Country: Poland
- Voivodeship: Łódź
- County: Poddębice
- Gmina: Wartkowice

Łążki [ˈwɔ̃ʂki] is a village in the administrative district of Gmina Wartkowice, within Poddębice County, Łódź Voivodeship, in central Poland.
