= Zelgoszcz, Poddębice County =

Zelgoszcz
- Village
- Location within Poland
- Coordinates: 51°59′45″N 18°53′25″E
- Country: Poland
- Voivodeship: Łódź
- County: Poddębice
- Gmina: Wartkowice

Zelgoszcz [ˈzɛlɡɔʂt͡ʂ] is a village in the administrative district of Gmina Wartkowice, within Poddębice County, Łódź Voivodeship, in central Poland.
