= Bronów, Poddębice County =

Bronów
- Village
- Location within Poland
- Coordinates: 51°57′49″N 18°54′45″E
- Country: Poland
- Voivodeship: Łódź
- County: Poddębice
- Gmina: Wartkowice

Bronów [ˈbrɔnuf] is a village in the administrative district of Gmina Wartkowice, within Poddębice County, Łódź Voivodeship, in central Poland.
