= Parądzice =

- Village
- Location within Poland
- Coordinates: 51°59′44″N 19°6′37″E
- Country: Poland
- Voivodeship: Łódź
- County: Poddębice
- Gmina: Wartkowice
- Elevation: 113.5 m (372 ft)
- Population: 86

Parądzice [parɔnˈd͡ʑit͡sɛ] is a village in the administrative district of Gmina Wartkowice, within Poddębice County, Łódź Voivodeship, in central Poland.
