= Ner, Łódź Voivodeship =

Ner
- Village
- Location within Poland
- Coordinates: 51°59′13″N 19°0′21″E
- Country: Poland
- Voivodeship: Łódź
- County: Poddębice
- Gmina: Wartkowice

Ner [nɛr] is a village in the administrative district of Gmina Wartkowice, within Poddębice County, Łódź Voivodeship, in central Poland.
