= Krzepocinek =

- Village
- Location within Poland
- Coordinates: 52°0′26″N 19°6′12″E
- Country: Poland
- Voivodeship: Łódź
- County: Poddębice
- Gmina: Wartkowice

Krzepocinek [kʂɛpɔˈt͡ɕinɛk] is a village in the administrative district of Gmina Wartkowice, within Poddębice County, Łódź Voivodeship, in central Poland.
