= Wierzbowa =

Wierzbowa may refer to the following places in Poland:

- Wierzbowa, Lower Silesian Voivodeship (south-west Poland)
- Wierzbowa, Poddębice County in Łódź Voivodeship (central Poland)
- Wierzbowa, Sieradz County in Łódź Voivodeship (central Poland)
