= Plewnik Pierwszy =

- Village
- Location within Poland
- Coordinates: 51°56′23″N 19°1′51″E
- Country: Poland
- Voivodeship: Łódź
- County: Poddębice
- Gmina: Wartkowice

Plewnik Pierwszy [ˈplɛvnik ˈpjɛrfʂɨ] is a village in the administrative district of Gmina Wartkowice, within Poddębice County, Łódź Voivodeship, in central Poland.
