= Kiki, Poddębice County =

Kiki
- Village
- Location within Poland
- Coordinates: 52°0′32″N 18°57′28″E
- Country: Poland
- Voivodeship: Łódź
- County: Poddębice
- Gmina: Wartkowice

Kiki [ˈkiki] is a village in the administrative district of Gmina Wartkowice, within Poddębice County, Łódź Voivodeship, in central Poland.
