= Powodów Pierwszy =

- Village
- Location within Poland
- Coordinates: 51°58′33″N 19°7′29″E
- Country: Poland
- Voivodeship: Łódź
- County: Poddębice
- Gmina: Wartkowice
- Population: 110

Powodów Pierwszy [pɔˈvɔduf ˈpjɛrfʂɨ] is a village in the administrative district of Gmina Wartkowice, within Poddębice County, Łódź Voivodeship, in central Poland.
