= Konopnica, Poddębice County =

Konopnica
- Village
- Location within Poland
- Coordinates: 51°58′27″N 18°54′49″E
- Country: Poland
- Voivodeship: Łódź
- County: Poddębice
- Gmina: Wartkowice

Konopnica [kɔnɔpˈnit͡sa] is a village in the administrative district of Gmina Wartkowice, within Poddębice County, Łódź Voivodeship, in central Poland.
