= Osmolin, Masovian Voivodeship =

Osmolin
- Village
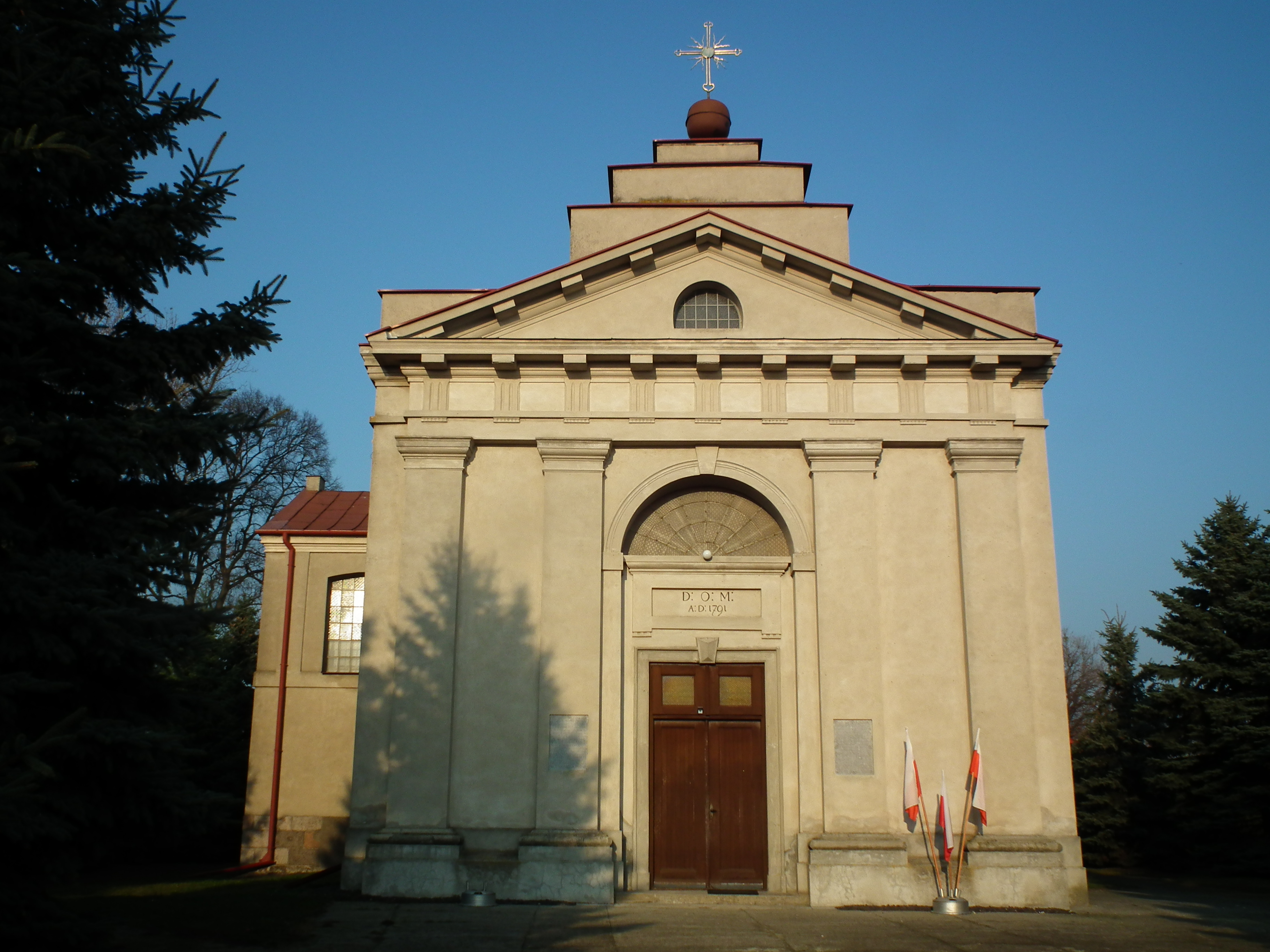
- Saint Martin church in Osmolin

- Location within Poland
- Coordinates: 52°17′51″N 19°50′30″E
- Country: Poland
- Voivodeship: Masovian
- County: Gostynin
- Gmina: Sanniki

Population
  - Total: 570
- Time zone: UTC+1 (CET)
  - Summer (DST): UTC+2 (CEST)
- Vehicle registration: WGS

Osmolin [ɔsˈmɔlin] is a village in the administrative district of Gmina Sanniki, within Gostynin County, Masovian Voivodeship, in central Poland.

The village is the site of the Osmolin Radio Tower.

Osmolin was granted Chełmno town rights modeled after Gąbin in 1439. It was a royal town of Poland, administratively located in the Gąbin County in the Rawa Voivodeship in the Greater Poland Province.
