= Sochaczew Land =

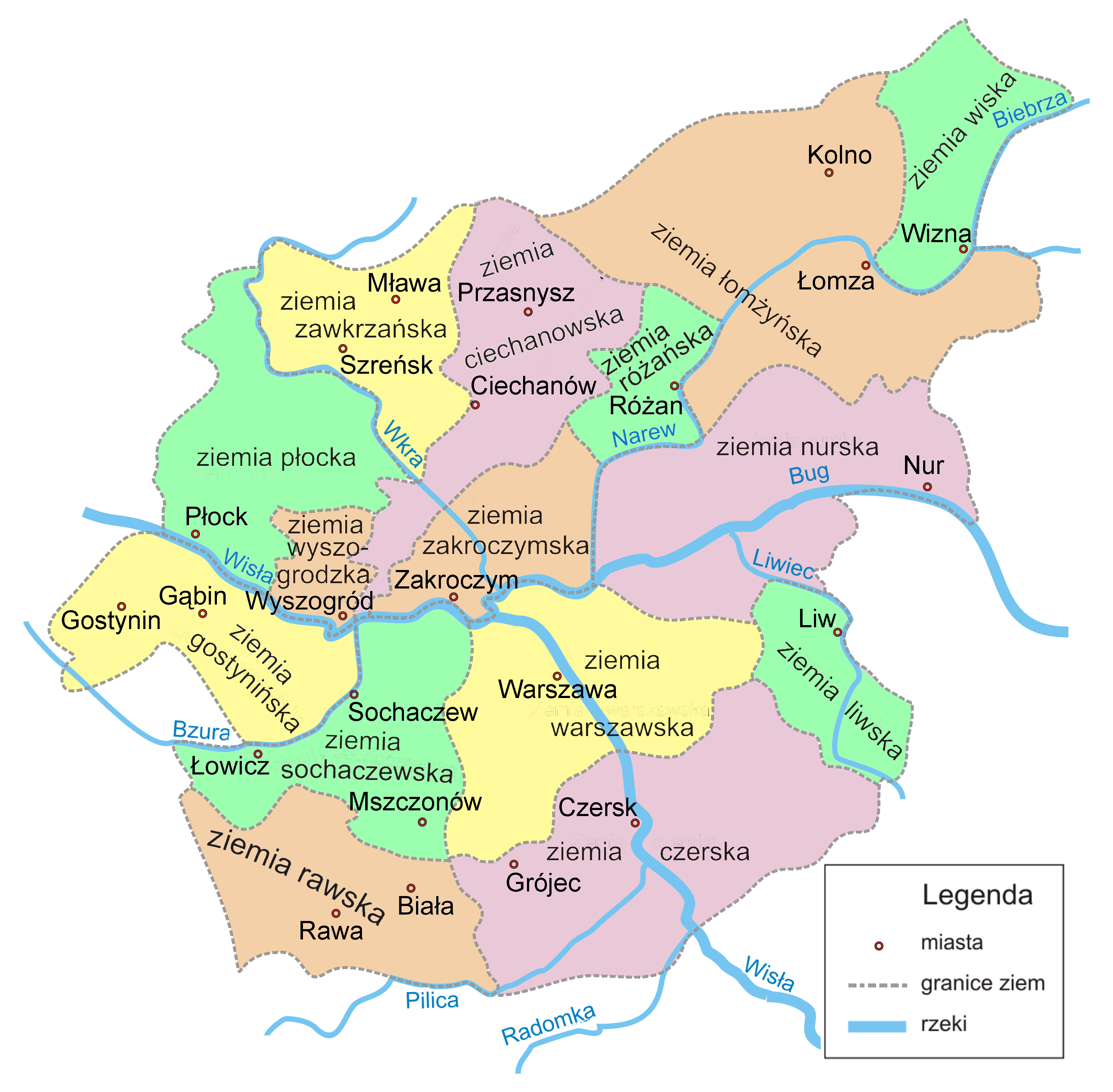
historical lands of Masovia

Sochaczew Land (Polish: ziemia sochaczewska), named after the town of Sochaczew, was an administrative unit (ziemia) of the Duchy of Mazovia, Kingdom of Poland and the Polish–Lithuanian Commonwealth. With its capital in Sochaczew, it belonged to Rawa Voivodeship. Sochaczew Land was divided into two counties: Sochaczew and Mszczonow.

The Land of Sochaczew ceased to exist after the Partitions of Poland.

== Sources ==
- History of Sochaczew and its county (in Polish)
