= Biała Góra, Poddębice County =

Biała Góra
- Village
- Location within Poland
- Coordinates: 51°58′29″N 19°3′23″E
- Country: Poland
- Voivodeship: Łódź
- County: Poddębice
- Gmina: Wartkowice

Biała Góra [ˈbjawa ˈɡura] is a village in the administrative district of Gmina Wartkowice, within Poddębice County, Łódź Voivodeship, in central Poland.
