= Powodów Trzeci =

- Village
- Location within Poland
- Coordinates: 51°58′16″N 19°5′53″E
- Country: Poland
- Voivodeship: Łódź
- County: Poddębice
- Gmina: Wartkowice

Powodów Trzeci [pɔˈvɔduf ˈtʂɛt͡ɕi] is a village in the administrative district of Gmina Wartkowice, within Poddębice County, Łódź Voivodeship, in central Poland.
