= Sędów, Poddębice County =

Sędów
- Village
- Location within Poland
- Coordinates: 51°56′11″N 18°57′44″E
- Country: Poland
- Voivodeship: Łódź
- County: Poddębice
- Gmina: Wartkowice

Sędów [ˈsɛnduf] is a village in the administrative district of Gmina Wartkowice, within Poddębice County, Łódź Voivodeship, in central Poland.
