= Polesie, Poddębice County =

Polesie
- Village
- Location within Poland
- Coordinates: 51°57′22″N 18°55′59″E
- Country: Poland
- Voivodeship: Łódź
- County: Poddębice
- Gmina: Wartkowice

Polesie [pɔˈlɛɕɛ] is a village in the administrative district of Gmina Wartkowice, within Poddębice County, Łódź Voivodeship, in central Poland.
