= Ujazd, Poddębice County =

Ujazd
- Village
- Location within Poland
- Coordinates: 51°57′N 19°4′E
- Country: Poland
- Voivodeship: Łódź
- County: Poddębice
- Gmina: Wartkowice

Ujazd [ˈujast] is a village in the administrative district of Gmina Wartkowice, within Poddębice County, Łódź Voivodeship, in central Poland.
