= Spędoszyn-Kolonia =

- Village
- Location within Poland
- Coordinates: 51°57′18″N 18°57′33″E
- Country: Poland
- Voivodeship: Łódź
- County: Poddębice
- Gmina: Wartkowice

Spędoszyn-Kolonia [spɛnˈdɔʂɨn kɔˈlɔɲa] is a village in the administrative district of Gmina Wartkowice, within Poddębice County, Łódź Voivodeship, in central Poland.
