= Tur, Łódź Voivodeship =

Tur
- Village
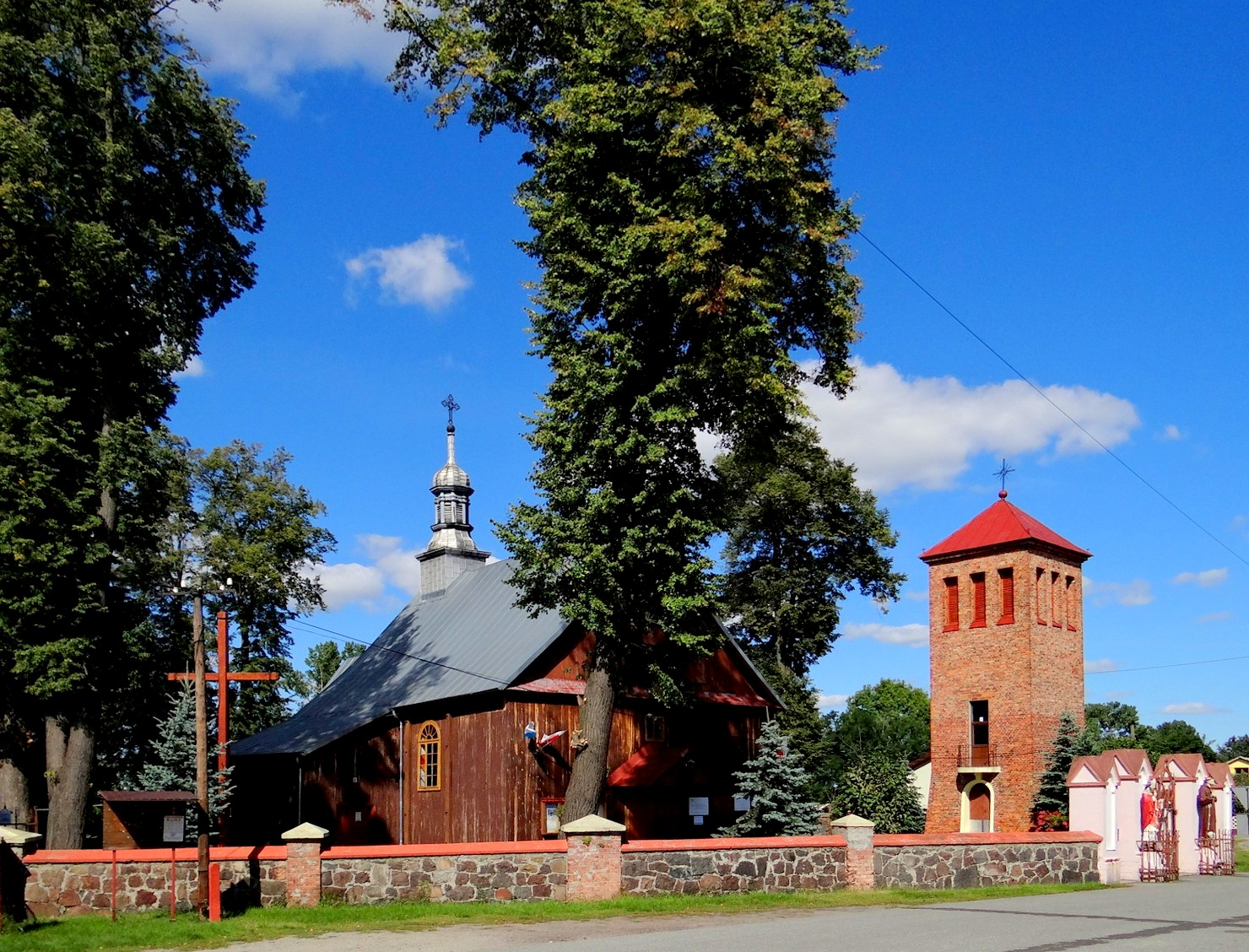
- Saints Peter and Paul church in Tur

- Location within Poland
- Coordinates: 51°57′N 18°59′E
- Country: Poland
- Voivodeship: Łódź
- County: Poddębice
- Gmina: Wartkowice
- First mentioned: 1136
- Time zone: UTC+1 (CET)
  - Summer (DST): UTC+2 (CEST)
- Vehicle registration: EPD

Tur [tur] is a village in the administrative district of Gmina Wartkowice, within Poddębice County, Łódź Voivodeship, in central Poland.
