= Światonia =

- Village
- Location within Poland
- Coordinates: 51°59′N 18°55′E
- Country: Poland
- Voivodeship: Łódź
- County: Poddębice
- Gmina: Wartkowice

Światonia (Polish pronunciation: [ɕfjaˈtɔɲa]) is a village in the administrative district of Gmina Wartkowice, within Poddębice County, Łódź Voivodeship, in central Poland.
