= Zygmunt Grudziński (1560–1618) =

Polish noble

Zygmunt Grudziński (1560–1618) was a Polish noble: castellan of Kruszwica (1593–1601), starost of Inowrocław and voivode of Rawa from 1613.

In 1606, he supported the rokosz of Zebrzydowski, arguing in Sandomierz that loyalty to the Polish–Lithuanian Commonwealth was more important than loyalty to the king, Sigismund III Vasa.
