= Plewnik Drugi =

- Village
- Location within Poland
- Coordinates: 51°56′37″N 19°3′19″E
- Country: Poland
- Voivodeship: Łódź
- County: Poddębice
- Gmina: Wartkowice
- Population: 100

Plewnik Drugi [ˈplɛvnik ˈdruɡi] is a village in the administrative district of Gmina Wartkowice, within Poddębice County, Łódź Voivodeship, in central Poland.
