= Zacisze, Poddębice County =

Zacisze
- Village
- Location within Poland
- Coordinates: 51°59′02″N 18°55′38″E
- Country: Poland
- Voivodeship: Łódź
- County: Poddębice
- Gmina: Wartkowice

Zacisze [zaˈt͡ɕiʂɛ] is a village in the administrative district of Gmina Wartkowice, within Poddębice County, Łódź Voivodeship, in central Poland.
