= Wola Niedźwiedzia =

- Village
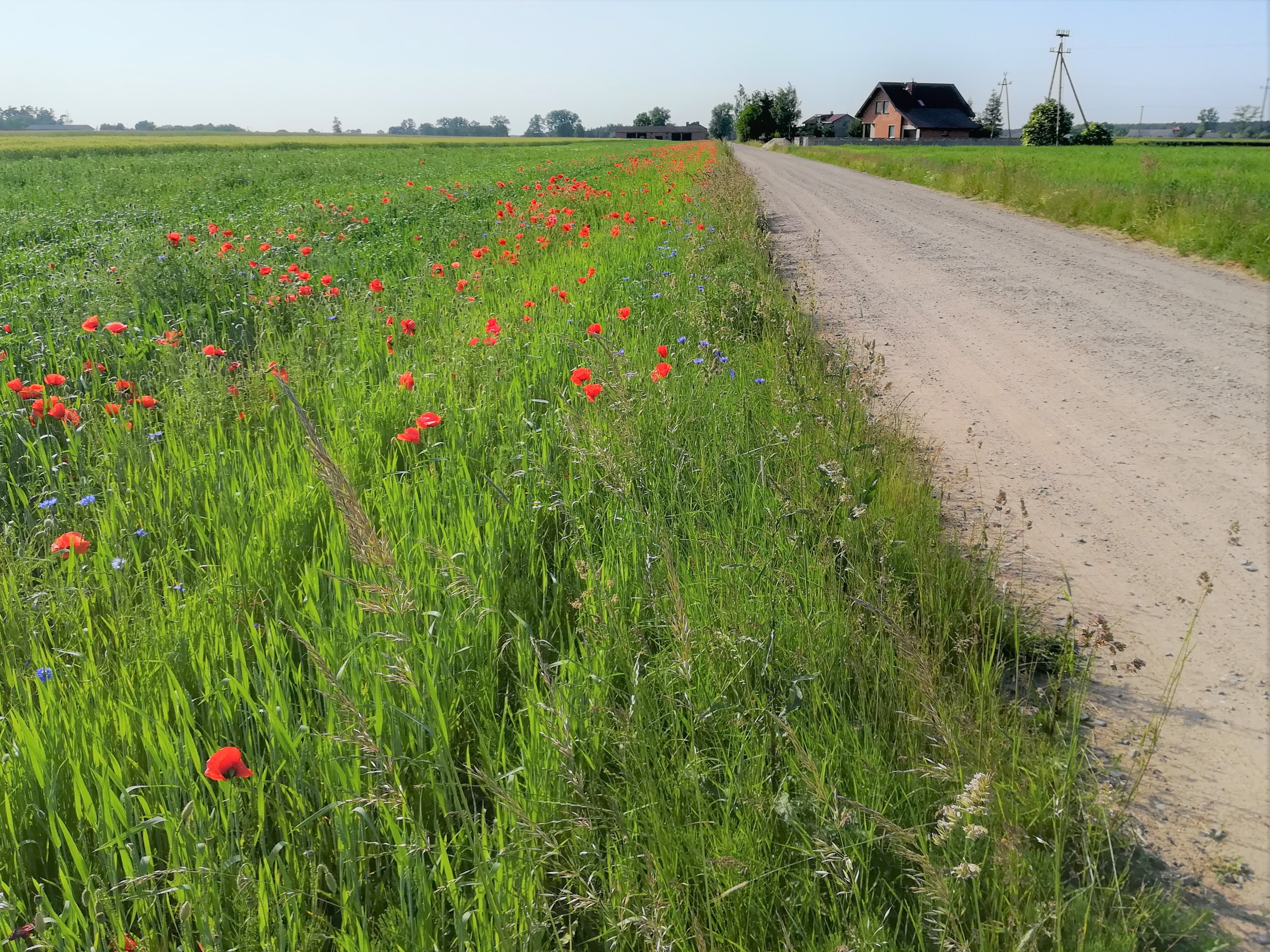

- Location within Poland
- Coordinates: 51°59′54″N 19°3′58″E
- Country: Poland
- Voivodeship: Łódź
- County: Poddębice
- Gmina: Wartkowice

Wola Niedźwiedzia [ˈvɔla ɲɛd͡ʑˈvjɛd͡ʑa] is a village in the administrative district of Gmina Wartkowice, within Poddębice County, Łódź Voivodeship, in central Poland.
