= Orzeszków, Gmina Wartkowice =

Orzeszków
- Village
- Location within Poland
- Coordinates: 51°57′24″N 19°3′15″E
- Country: Poland
- Voivodeship: Łódź
- County: Poddębice
- Gmina: Wartkowice

Orzeszków [ɔˈʐɛʂkuf] is a village in the administrative district of Gmina Wartkowice, within Poddębice County, Łódź Voivodeship, in central Poland.
