= Brudnówek =

- Village
- Location within Poland
- Coordinates: 51°59′13″N 18°56′56″E
- Country: Poland
- Voivodeship: Łódź
- County: Poddębice
- Gmina: Wartkowice
- Population: 50

Brudnówek [brudˈnuvɛk] is a village in the administrative district of Gmina Wartkowice, within Poddębice County, Łódź Voivodeship, in central Poland.
