= Zalesie, Gmina Wartkowice =

Zalesie
- Village
- Location within Poland
- Coordinates: 51°57′59″N 18°56′14″E
- Country: Poland
- Voivodeship: Łódź
- County: Poddębice
- Gmina: Wartkowice

Zalesie [zaˈlɛɕɛ] is a village in the administrative district of Gmina Wartkowice, within Poddębice County, Łódź Voivodeship, in central Poland.
