= Wola-Dąbrowa =

- Village
- Location within Poland
- Coordinates: 51°59′46″N 19°4′38″E
- Country: Poland
- Voivodeship: Łódź
- County: Poddębice
- Gmina: Wartkowice

Wola-Dąbrowa [ˈvɔla dɔmˈbrɔva] is a village in the administrative district of Gmina Wartkowice, within Poddębice County, Łódź Voivodeship, in central Poland.
