= Wilkowice, Poddębice County =

Wilkowice
- Village
- Location within Poland
- Coordinates: 51°56′6″N 18°59′27″E
- Country: Poland
- Voivodeship: Łódź
- County: Poddębice
- Gmina: Wartkowice
- Population: 70

Wilkowice [vilkɔˈvit͡sɛ] is a village in the administrative district of Gmina Wartkowice, within Poddębice County, Łódź Voivodeship, in central Poland.
