= Zawada, Poddębice County =

Zawada
- Village
- Location within Poland
- Coordinates: 51°59′50″N 18°59′30″E
- Country: Poland
- Voivodeship: Łódź
- County: Poddębice
- Gmina: Wartkowice

Zawada [zaˈvada] is a village in the administrative district of Gmina Wartkowice, within Poddębice County, Łódź Voivodeship, in central Poland.
