= Kazimierz Pelczar =

Polish academic and physician

- Born: 2 August 1894; Truskawiec, Łódź Voivodeship
- Died: 17 September 1943 (aged 49); Aukštieji Paneriai, Vilnius

Kazimierz Pelczar (1894–1943) was a Polish academic and physician. Professor of the Stefan Batory University in Vilnius and pioneer of oncology research and treatment, he was murdered in the Ponary massacre.

== Biography ==
Kazimierz Pelczar was born on 2 August 1894 in Truskawiec. His father, Z. Pelczar, was a physician himself, owner of a sanatorium and author of about 20 articles. In the years 1912–1914 he studied medicine at Jagiellonian University in Kraków. During the First World War he was conscripted by the Austro-Hungarian Army, he was taken prisoner of war by the Imperial Russian Army in 1915 and soon joined the Red Cross. After the First World War he joined Polish Army and served as a physician for the Siberian Division (1918–1920). In 1920 he returned to the newly independent Poland, finishing studies at the Jagiellonian University where in 1925 he got his PhD.

During the following years he worked in Collegium Medicum in Kraków, as well as in Germany and France. In 1929 he got his habilitation, and in 1930 he was invited to the Stefan Batory University in Vilnius, Wilno Voivodship in Poland, to head the Department of General and Experimental Pathology of Faculty of Medicine (from 1930 to 1939). He also was the head of the Department of Bacteriology (1935–1937), the dean (school year 1937-1938), and vice-dean in the following year. Under his leadership the Vilnius Department of Medicine flourished, with many important publications, and with students who would go to become notable academics and physicians themselves (like professor J. Olszewski of Toronto, member of the Moscow Academy of Sciences M. Beklemishev, and J. Sztachelski, Poland's Minister of Health). In 1936 he organized the international 4th Congress Against Cancer in Vilnius.

In May 1931 noting the lack of oncology-related health care in the Vilnius region he established the Institute of Oncology and Clinic, which constantly grew under his supervision. He was personally engaged in treatment of many patients, in addition to his duties as a lecturer and researcher. He was a member of several Polish and international oncological organizations.

With the coming signs of war, he was offered positions by many other universities - from Warsaw, Rome, Paris, London and New York City - but refused. After the German and Soviet invasions of Poland in 1939, Vilnius was occupied by the Soviet Union. Professor Pelczar helped the Polish Red Cross provided care for thousands of refugees. In 1941 after German invasion of the Soviet Union, he continued to help various refugees, among them, Jews hiding from the Nazis, and working with medical services of Polish resistance organization Armia Krajowa. At night, from 16 to 17 September 1943, he was arrested by the Lithuanian Security Police ('Sauguma') in a standard retaliatory actions against the Armia Krajowa, whose members on 15 September assassinated a Lithuanian Gestapo collaborator, member of Lithuanian security police, Marianas Padabas. Out of 100 arrested members of Polish intelligentsia, 10 were randomly selected and executed on the morning of September 17, becoming ones of the 100 000 victims who died in Ponary. Professor Pelczar was among them, along with fellow professor of the Stefan Batory university, Mieczysław Gutkowski, 2 Polish army officers, 3 officials, a lawyer and 2 engineers. A day later an order from Germany ordered his release - but it was too late.

== Works ==
The main fields of medicine in which he worked and published many publications were oncology, arthrology, cardiology, hematology and health-resort science. In total, he published about 85 large scientific works in Polish, French and German and many popular articles in everyday press.

Selected works:

- "Transplantation of malignant tumours" (Paris, 1928)
- "Aleksin and cancer" (Paris, 1931)
- "Importance of inheritance in human pathology" (1932)
- "Respiratory System and Blood" (Wilno, 1936)
- "Pathology of Respiratory System and Blood" (Wilno, 1936)
- "Pathology of pancreas" (1937)
- "General Pathology" (Wilno, 1938)
