= Sucha Górna, Łódź Voivodeship =

Sucha Górna
- Village
- Location within Poland
- Coordinates: 51°59′N 19°6′E
- Country: Poland
- Voivodeship: Łódź
- County: Poddębice
- Gmina: Wartkowice

Sucha Górna [ˈsuxa ˈɡurna] is a village in the administrative district of Gmina Wartkowice, within Poddębice County, Łódź Voivodeship, in central Poland.
