= Drwalew, Łódź Voivodeship =

Drwalew
- Village
- Location within Poland
- Coordinates: 51°58′1″N 19°4′15″E
- Country: Poland
- Voivodeship: Warszawa
- County: Grójec
- Gmina: Chynów
- Time zone: UTC+1 (CET)
  - Summer (DST): UTC+2 (CEST)

Drwalew [ˈdrvalɛf] is a village in the administrative district of Gmina Chynów, within Grójec, Warsaw Voivodeship, in central Poland.
