= Pełczyska, Łódź Voivodeship =

Pełczyska
- Village
- Location within Poland
- Coordinates: 52°0′5″N 19°2′55″E
- Country: Poland
- Voivodeship: Łódź
- County: Poddębice
- Gmina: Wartkowice

Pełczyska [pɛu̯ˈt͡ʂɨska] is a village in the administrative district of Gmina Wartkowice, within Poddębice County, Łódź Voivodeship, in central Poland.
