= Biernacice, Łódź Voivodeship =

Biernacice
- Village
- Location within Poland
- Coordinates: 51°57′54″N 18°52′0″E
- Country: Poland
- Voivodeship: Łódź
- County: Poddębice
- Gmina: Wartkowice

Biernacice [bjɛrnaˈt͡ɕit͡sɛ] is a village in the administrative district of Gmina Wartkowice, within Poddębice County, Łódź Voivodeship, in central Poland.
