= Wartkowice =

- Village
- Coat of arms

- Location within Poland
- Coordinates: 51°59′N 19°1′E
- Country: Poland
- Voivodeship: Łódź
- County: Poddębice
- Gmina: Wartkowice

Government
  - Mayor: Piotr Stanisław Kuropatwa

Area
  - Total: 141.8 km^{2} (54.7 sq mi)

Population (2011)
  - Total: 6,329
  - Density: 44.63/km^{2} (115.6/sq mi)
- Postal Code: 99-220
- Area Code: (+48) 43
- Vehicle registration: EPD
- Website: www.wartkowice.pl

Wartkowice [vartkɔˈvit͡sɛ] is a village in Poddębice County, Łódź Voivodeship, in central Poland.
