= Jadwisin, Łódź Voivodeship =

Jadwisin
- Village
- Location within Poland
- Coordinates: 51°57′58″N 18°57′20″E
- Country: Poland
- Voivodeship: Łódź
- County: Poddębice
- Gmina: Wartkowice
- Population (approx.): 70

Jadwisin [jadˈviɕin] is a village in the administrative district of Gmina Wartkowice, within Poddębice County, Łódź Voivodeship, in central Poland.

The village has an approximate population of 70.
