= Chodów, Łódź Voivodeship =

Chodów
- Village
- Location within Poland
- Coordinates: 52°0′26″N 19°4′19″E
- Country: Poland
- Voivodeship: Łódź
- County: Poddębice
- Gmina: Wartkowice

Chodów [ˈxɔduf] is a village in the administrative district of Gmina Wartkowice, within Poddębice County, Łódź Voivodeship, in central Poland.
