= Stary Gostków =

- Village
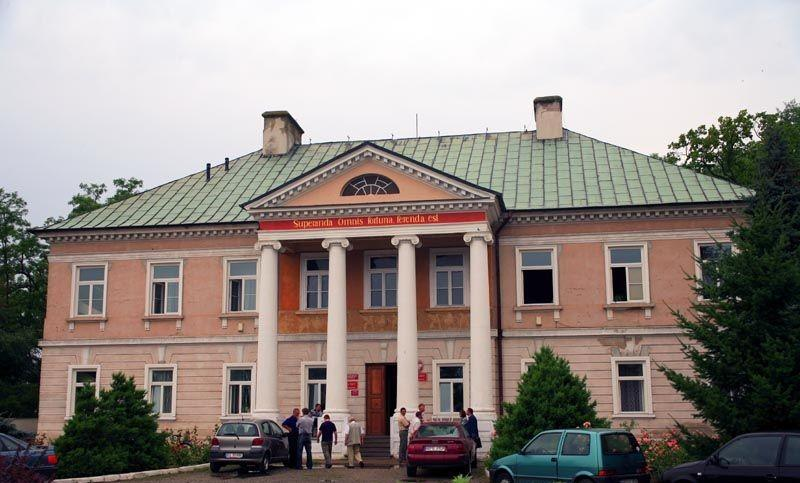
- Manor in the village

- Location within Poland
- Coordinates: 51°58′27″N 19°1′17″E
- Country: Poland
- Voivodeship: Łódź
- County: Poddębice
- Gmina: Wartkowice

Stary Gostków [ˈstarɨ ˈɡɔstkuf] is a village in the administrative district of Gmina Wartkowice, within Poddębice County, Łódź Voivodeship, in central Poland.
