= Wierzbówka, Łódź Voivodeship =

Wierzbówka
- Village
- Location within Poland
- Coordinates: 51°58′12″N 19°5′19″E
- Country: Poland
- Voivodeship: Łódź
- County: Poddębice
- Gmina: Wartkowice
- Population: 60

Wierzbówka [vjɛʐˈbufka] is a village in the administrative district of Gmina Wartkowice, within Poddębice County, Łódź Voivodeship, in central Poland.
