= Sucha Dolna, Łódź Voivodeship =

Sucha Dolna
- Village
- Location within Poland
- Coordinates: 51°59′27″N 19°6′5″E
- Country: Poland
- Voivodeship: Łódź
- County: Poddębice
- Gmina: Wartkowice

Sucha Dolna [ˈsuxa ˈdɔlna] is a village in the administrative district of Gmina Wartkowice, within Poddębice County, Łódź Voivodeship, in central Poland.

== Massacre during Second World War ==
During the German Invasion of Poland in 1939, German forces on 11 September murdered 11 villagers. The victims were beaten to death with blunt weapons. The victims include two children.
