= Wierzbowa, Poddębice County =

Wierzbowa
- Village
- Location within Poland
- Coordinates: 51°58′58″N 19°4′52″E
- Country: Poland
- Voivodeship: Łódź
- County: Poddębice
- Gmina: Wartkowice

Wierzbowa [vjɛʐˈbɔva] is a village in the administrative district of Gmina Wartkowice, within Poddębice County, Łódź Voivodeship, in central Poland.
