= Starzyny, Łódź Voivodeship =

Starzyny
- Village
- Location within Poland
- Coordinates: 51°58′12″N 19°02′48″E
- Country: Poland
- Voivodeship: Łódź
- County: Poddębice
- Gmina: Wartkowice

Starzyny [staˈʐɨnɨ] is a village in the administrative district of Gmina Wartkowice, within Poddębice County, Łódź Voivodeship, in central Poland.
