= South Prussia =

Province of Prussia

South Prussia Provinz Südpreußen (de) Prusy Południowe (pl)
- Province of Prussia
- 1793–1807
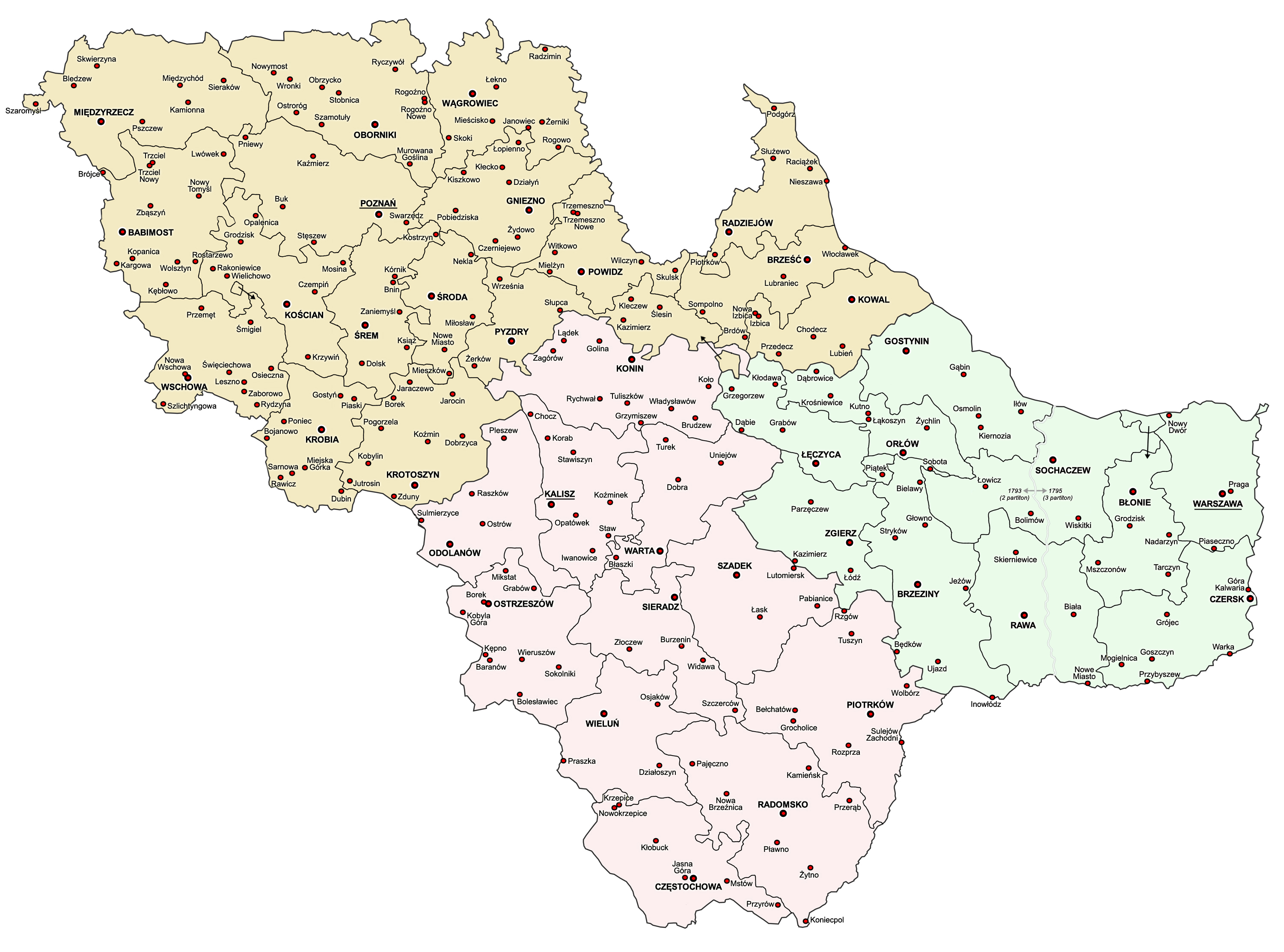
- South Prussia 1795–1806
- Capital: Poznań (Posen); Warsaw (Warschau) from 1795
- Area
  - 1806: 53,000 km^{2} (20,000 sq mi)
- Population
  - 1806: 1,503,508
- History
  - 2nd Polish Partition: 25 September 1793
  - Annexed Warsaw: 1795
  - Treaties of Tilsit: 9 July 1807
- Political subdivisions: Kalisz (Kalisch); Poznań (Posen); Warsaw (Warschau)
Preceded by
Poznań Voivodeship
Kalisz Voivodeship
Gniezno Voivodeship
Sieradz Voivodeship
Łęczyca Voivodeship
Brześć Kujawski Voivodeship
Płock Voivodeship
Rawa Voivodeship
Masovian Voivodeship
Succeeded by
Duchy of Warsaw
- Today part of: Poland

South Prussia (German: Provinz Südpreußen; Polish: Prusy Południowe) was a province of the Kingdom of Prussia from 1793 to 1807 created out of territory annexed in the Second Partition of Poland.

== History ==
South Prussia was created out of territory annexed in the Second Partition of Poland and in 1793 included:

- the Poznań, Kalisz and Gniezno Voivodeships of Greater Poland;
- the lands of Sieradz and Łęczyca;
- the Kuyavian voivodeship of Brześć and Dobrzyń Land;
- adjacent parts of the Masovian voivodeships of Płock and Rawa.

The capital of the province was Poznań (1793–1795) at first, afterwards Warsaw (1795–1806), which was added in 1795 after the Third Partition, but it was actually administered by the General Directory (General-Direktorium) in Berlin.

South Prussia bordered on the Brandenburgian Neumark region in the west and the Prussian Netze District in the north. After the Third Partition, the lands of Dobrzyń and Płock northeast of the Vistula river were transferred to New East Prussia, while South Prussia gained the Warsaw region of the former Masovian Voivodeship. In the southeast the Pilica river marked the border with those Lesser Polish territories that in 1795 became part of Austrian New Galicia. In the southwest it bordered on the Prussian Silesia Province and New Silesia, a smaller province including the former Duchy of Siewierz, which was administered from South Prussia.

Some German colonists invited to settle on the province's noble estates were known as Hauländer, while others who settled on royal crown lands were known as Kolonisten. The term Hauländer is a German corruption of the original Hollender who negotiated special terms of democratic rule for their settlements which came to be known as Hollendry. Many Germans still lived under the Schulzendorf style of village government and therefore were not Hauländer.

The underdeveloped province was administered with fiscal profit being a primary goal. The first provincial minister Otto von Voss said that “South Prussia shall not have been bought at too high a price: it should be no burden to other provinces, it should even benefit them and the Prussian state” Thus, while engaging in Germanisation of Poles during the Partitions, the Prussian state extracted more revenue than what it spent from the province and levied duties on goods from the province, which seriously discouraged its industrial development.

Following Napoleon Bonaparte's victory in the War of the Fourth Coalition and a Polish uprising, the territory of South Prussia became part of the Duchy of Warsaw, a French client state, according to the 1807 Treaties of Tilsit. After the Congress of Vienna in 1815, it was divided between the Prussian Grand Duchy of Posen and Congress Poland, a part of the Russian Empire.

The General Directory records dealing with the history and genealogy of the Prussian part of Poland were taken from the Prussian archives by Napoleon Bonaparte soon after 1806 and transferred to Warsaw.

== Demographics ==
In 1806, the province had 1,503,508 inhabitants.

== Administration ==
=== Departments ===
It was subdivided into the Kammerdepartements Posen (Poznań), Kalisch (Kalisz), and Warschau (Warsaw).

=== Districts ===
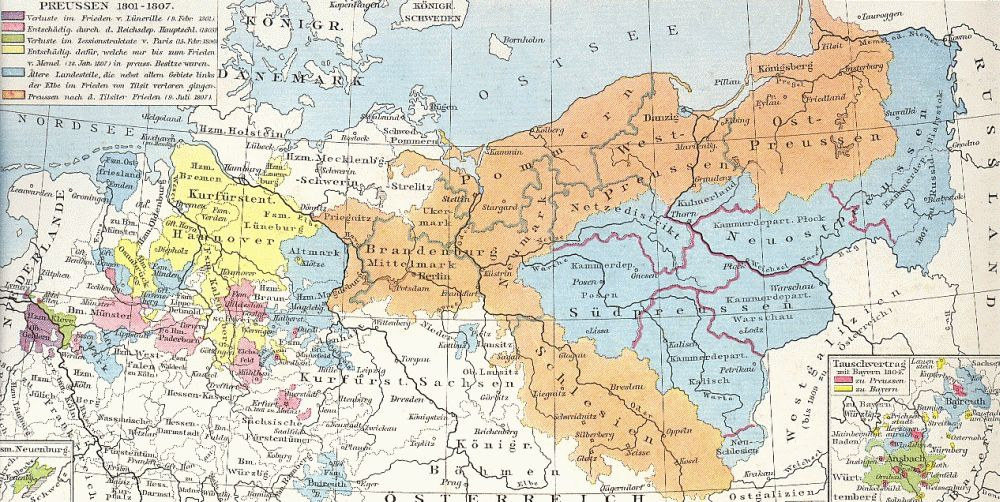
Map South Prussia (Südpreussen) and the Departments of Posen, Kalisch, and Warschau, 1801–1807

In 1806, South Prussia consisted of three departments (Kriegs- und Domänen-Kammern) divided into the following districts or counties (Kreise):

Kalisch Department	Posen Department	Warschau Department
Kalisch; Adelnau; Konin; Ostreschow; Wieluń; Lumtomiersk; Warta; Schadeck; Sieradz; Petrikau; Radomsk; Czenstochau	Posen; Oborniki; Meseritz; Bomst; Fraustadt; Krebe, (later Kröben); Schrimm; Kosten; Krotoschin; Peisern; Schroda; Gnesen; Wangrowitz; Powitz; Brzesk; Radziejów; Kowal	Warschau; Blonin; Tschersk; Rawa; Sochaczew; Gostin; Orlow; Lenczyca; Zgierz; Brzezin
