= Mszczonów =

Town in Masovian Voivodeship, Poland

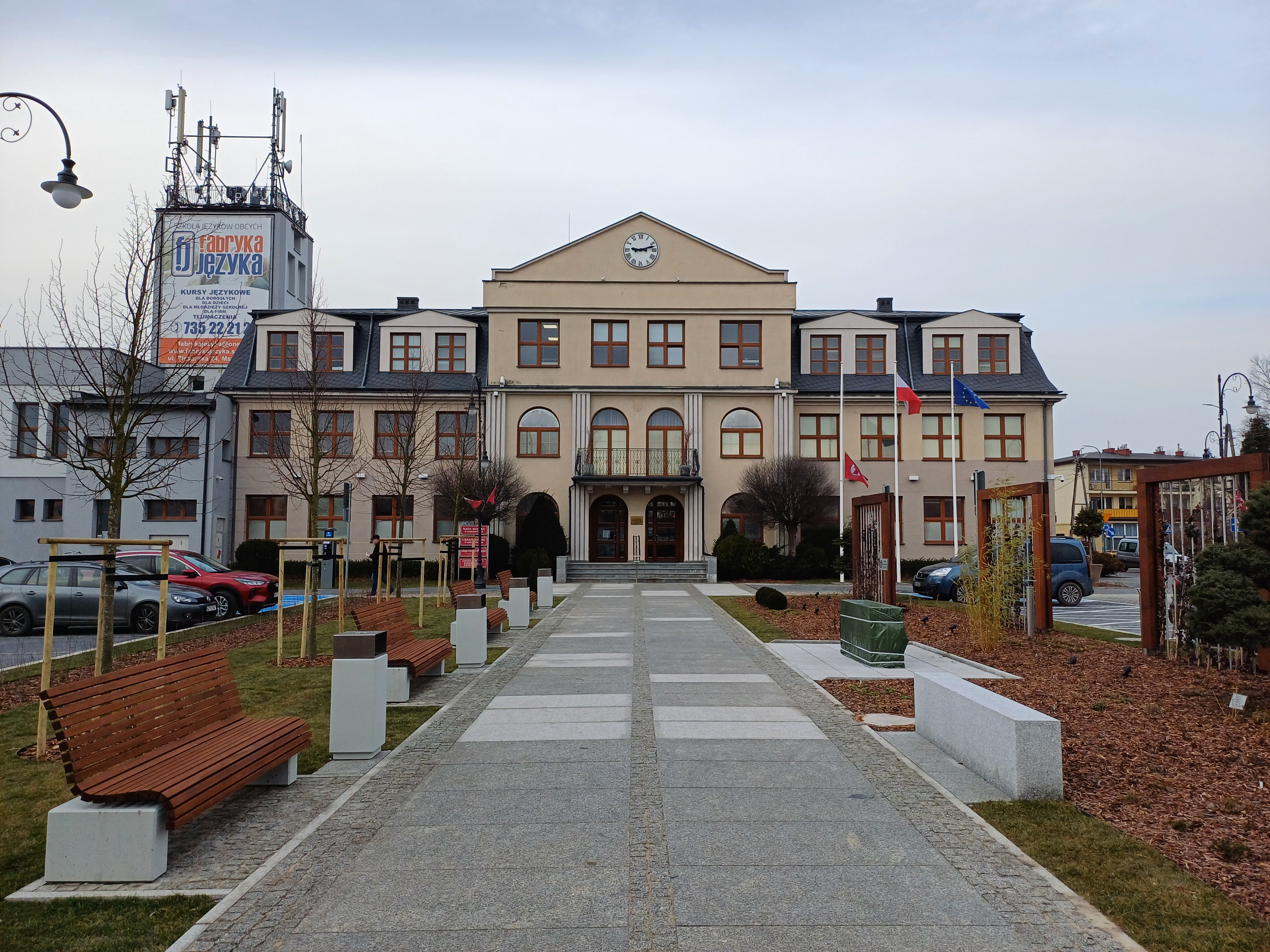
- Town hall in Mszczonów

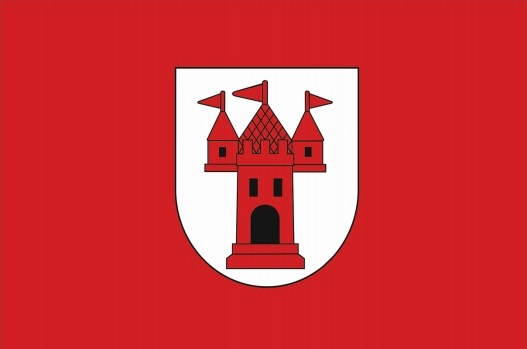
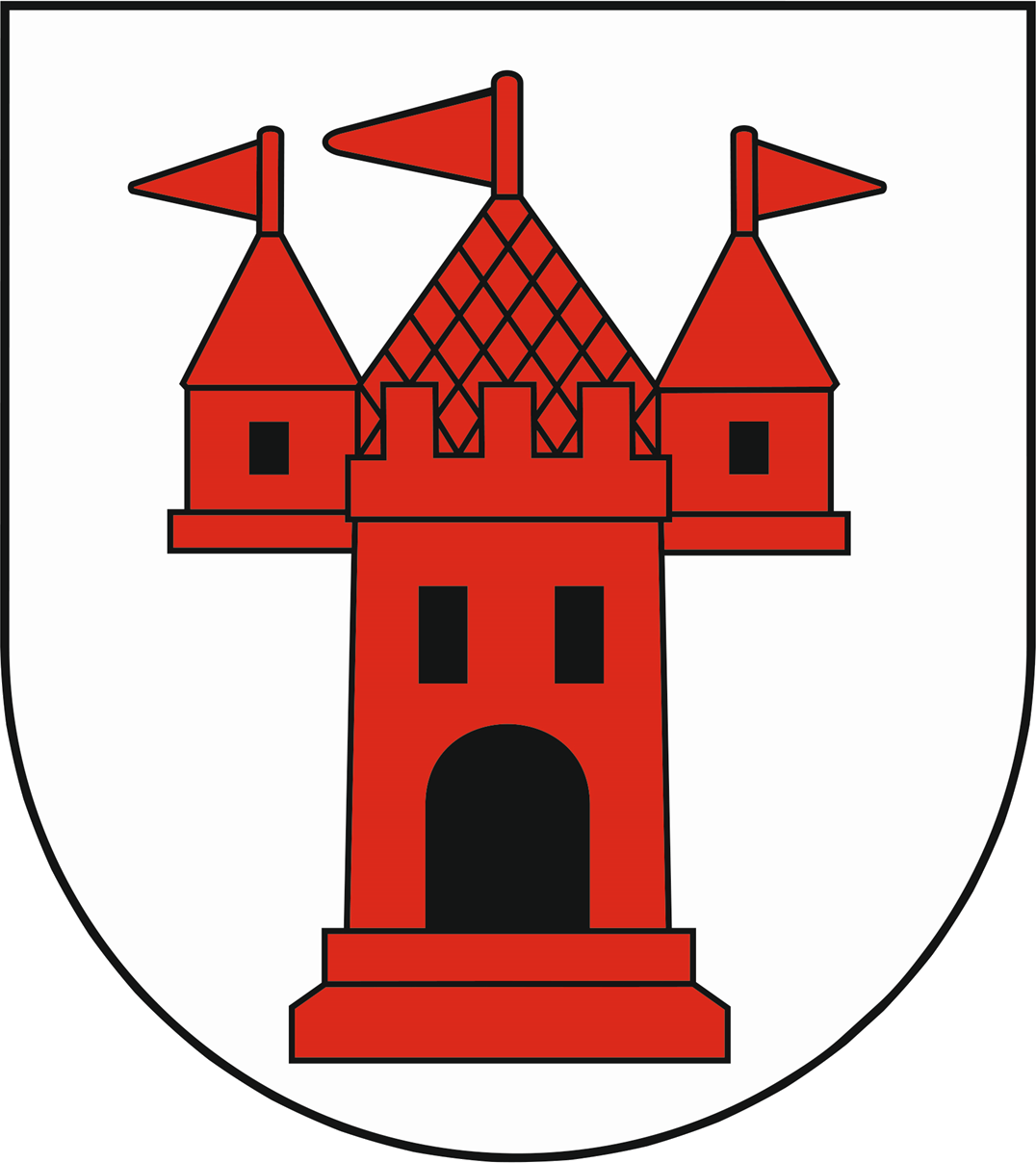
- Flag Coat of arms
- Interactive map of Mszczonów
- Location within Poland
- Coordinates: 51°58′27″N 20°31′36″E
- Country: Poland
- Voivodeship: Masovian
- County: Żyrardów
- Gmina: Mszczonów
- First mentioned: 1245
- Town rights: 1377

Government
  - Mayor: Łukasz Koperski

Area
  - Total: 8.56 km^{2} (3.31 sq mi)

Population (2006)
  - Total: 6,231
  - Density: 728/km^{2} (1,890/sq mi)
- Time zone: UTC+1 (CET)
  - Summer (DST): UTC+2 (CEST)
- Postal code: 96-320
- Area code: +48 46
- Car plates: WZY
- Website: www.mszczonow.pl

Mszczonów [ˈmʂt͡ʂɔnuf] is a town in Żyrardów County, Masovian Voivodeship, in central Poland, with 6,231 inhabitants as of the 2006 census. It is situated just outside the Warsaw metropolitan area, approximately 45 km (28 mi) from Warsaw city centre.

== History ==
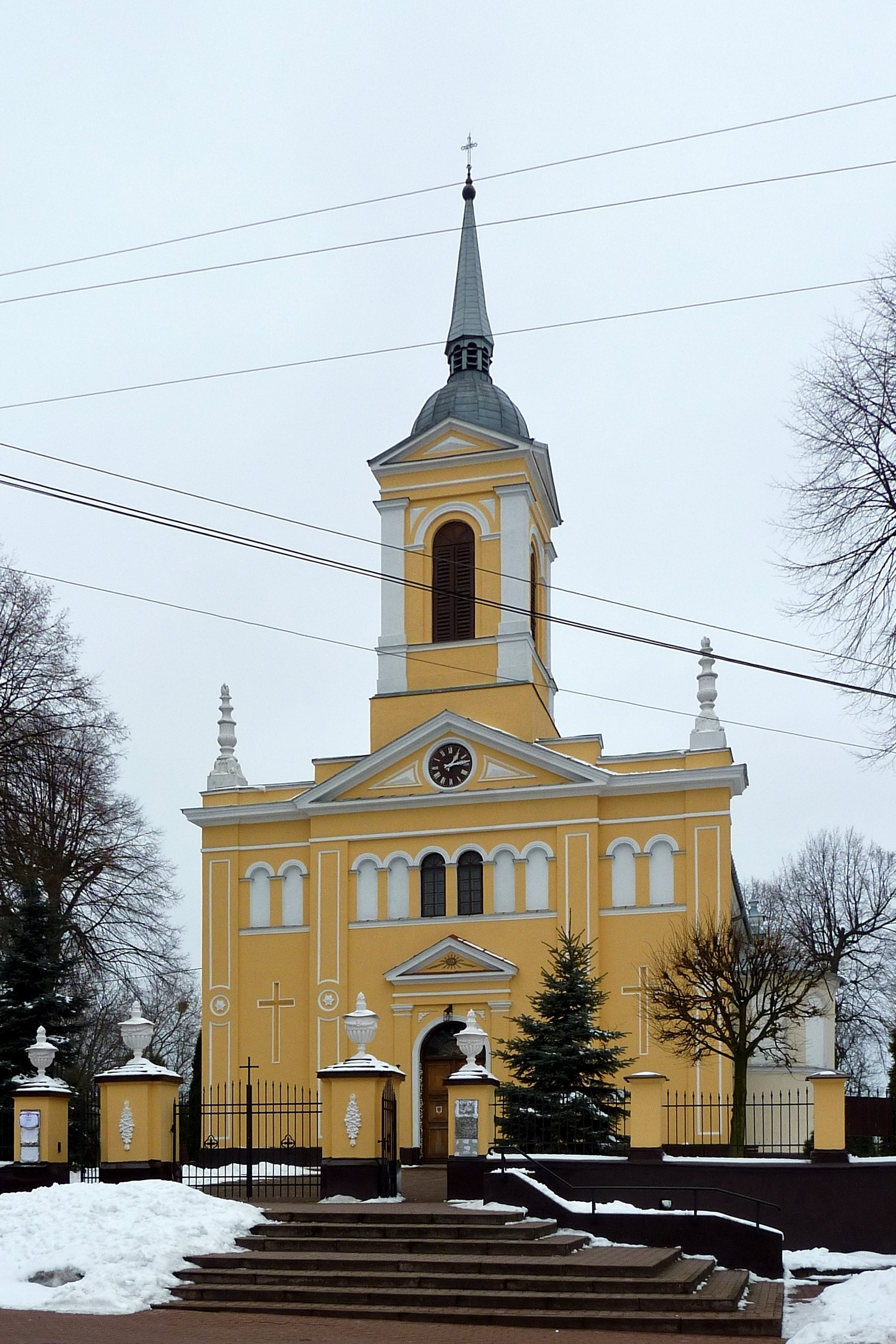
Saint John the Baptist church

The oldest known mention of Mszczonów comes from a document of Duke Konrad I of Masovia from 1245, when it was part of fragmented Piast-ruled Poland. Mszczonów was granted town rights in 1377 or earlier. It was a county seat and royal town of Poland, administratively located in the Rawa Voivodeship in the Greater Poland Province. One of two main routes connecting Warsaw and Dresden ran through the town in the 18th century and Kings Augustus II the Strong and Augustus III of Poland often traveled that route.

The town possessed a vibrant Jewish community, and it was once the center of the Hasidic Amshinov dynasty (Mszczonów being pronounced as "Amshinov" in Yiddish.) According to the 1921 census, the town had a population of 5,014, of which 80.1% declared Polish nationality and 19.7% declared Jewish nationality.

During the invasion of Poland, which started World War II in September 1939, the town was invaded by Nazi Germany. On September 8, 1939, German troops murdered 11 Polish prisoners of war in the town, and on September 11, 1939, the Germans carried out a mass execution of 20 local Poles, including mayor Aleksander Tański, two priests and a doctor (see Nazi crimes against the Polish nation). At least five Poles from Mszczonów were murdered by the Russians in the large Katyn massacre in 1940. In late 1940, about 2,000 Jews were concentrated in a ghetto that was set up in the town, from which they were marched to Żyrardów in February 1941. From there, they were deported to the Warsaw Ghetto.

== Demographics ==
Historical population

Year	Pop.	±%
1897	5,124	—
1921	5,014	−2.1%
1931	5,523	+10.2%
1939	5,450	−1.3%

Year	Pop.	±%
1950	2,851	−47.7%
1960	3,297	+15.6%
2010	6,247	+89.5%

== Sports and recreation ==
Deepspot, the second deepest swimming pool in the world, is located in the town.

The local football team is KS Mszczonowianka. It competes in the lower leagues.

== Notable people ==
- Jan Adam Maklakiewicz (1899–1954), Polish composer and conductor, whose former home houses a museum
- Roman Sikorski (1920–1983), Polish mathematician
- Mieczysław Zdzienicki (1892–1953), Polish social activist, lawyer and bibliophile
