= Truskawiec, Łódź Voivodeship =

Truskawiec
- Village
- Location within Poland
- Coordinates: 51°53′N 18°54′E
- Country: Poland
- Voivodeship: Łódź
- County: Poddębice
- Gmina: Wartkowice

Truskawiec [trusˈkavjɛt͡s] is a village in the administrative district of Gmina Wartkowice, within Poddębice County, Łódź Voivodeship, in central Poland.
