= Rawa Voivodeship =

Former administrative division of the Kingdom of Poland

Coordinates: 51°45′56″N 20°15′17″E

Rawa Voivodeship Województwo rawskie Palatinatus Ravensis
- Voivodeship of Poland¹
- 1462–1793
- Coat of arms

- The Rawa Voivodeship in the Polish–Lithuanian Commonwealth in 1635.
- Capital: Rawa
- Area
  - 1578: 6,200 km^{2} (2,400 sq mi)
- Population
  - 1578: 138,700
- History
  - Established: 1462
  - Second partition: 25 September 1793
- Political subdivisions: Three lands divided into 6 counties
Preceded by	Succeeded by
Duchy of Masovia / Duchy of Masovia	South Prussia
- Today part of: Poland
- ¹ Voivodeship of the Kingdom of Poland. The kingdom was part of the Polish–Lithuanian Commonwealth from 1569.

Rawa Voivodeship (Polish: Województwo Rawskie) was a unit of administrative division and local government in the Kingdom of Poland since 15th century until the partitions of Poland in 1795. It was part of the Greater Poland Province. Together with the Płock and Masovian Voivodeships it formed the former Duchy of Masovia.

The voivodeship had its capital in the town of Rawa Mazowiecka, and its origins date back to the second half of the 15th century. In 1462, after the deaths of local Piast dynasty dukes, Mazovian lands of Rawa and Gostynin were incorporated into the Crown of the Kingdom of Poland. In 1476, the Land of Sochaczew returned to Poland as well. Borders of Rawa Voivodeship remained unchanged for more than 300 years, until the second partition of Poland in 1793, when it was annexed by the Kingdom of Prussia. Rawa Voivodeship had four senators in the Senate of the Polish–Lithuanian Commonwealth. These were the Voivode of Rawa, the Castellan of Rawa, and the castellans of Sochaczew and Gostynin. Local starostas resided in Rawa, Sochaczew and Gostynin.

Zygmunt Gloger in his monumental book Historical Geography of the Lands of Old Poland provides this description of Rawa Voivodeship:

“In the 15th century, the Duchy of Mazovia, ruled by local branch of the Piast dynasty, was divided into three parts, one of which was the Duchy of Rawa (...) On January 1, 1462, Siemowit VI died at the age of eighteen. A few weeks later, his teenage brother Wladyslaw II also died. Siemowit VI was the Duke of Plock and Rawa, and after his death, King Kazimierz Jagiellonczyk decided to incorporate the Duchy of Rawa, making it the first part of Mazovia that returned to Poland (...)

Rawa Voivodeship had the area of 92 sq. miles. It was divided into three lands: those of Rawa, Sochaczew and Gostynin. Each land was divided into two counties. The lands were of roughly the same size, and in the mid-16th century, whole voivodeship had 100 Roman Catholic parishes and 15 towns (...) Sejmiks took place at Rawa, Sochaczew and Gąbin, during which two deputies to the Sejm, and two deputies to the Greater Poland Tribunal were elected (...) Rawa Voivodeship shared its coat of arms with Plock Voivodeship”.

== Municipal government ==
Voivodeship Governor (Wojewoda) seat:

- Rawa Mazowiecka

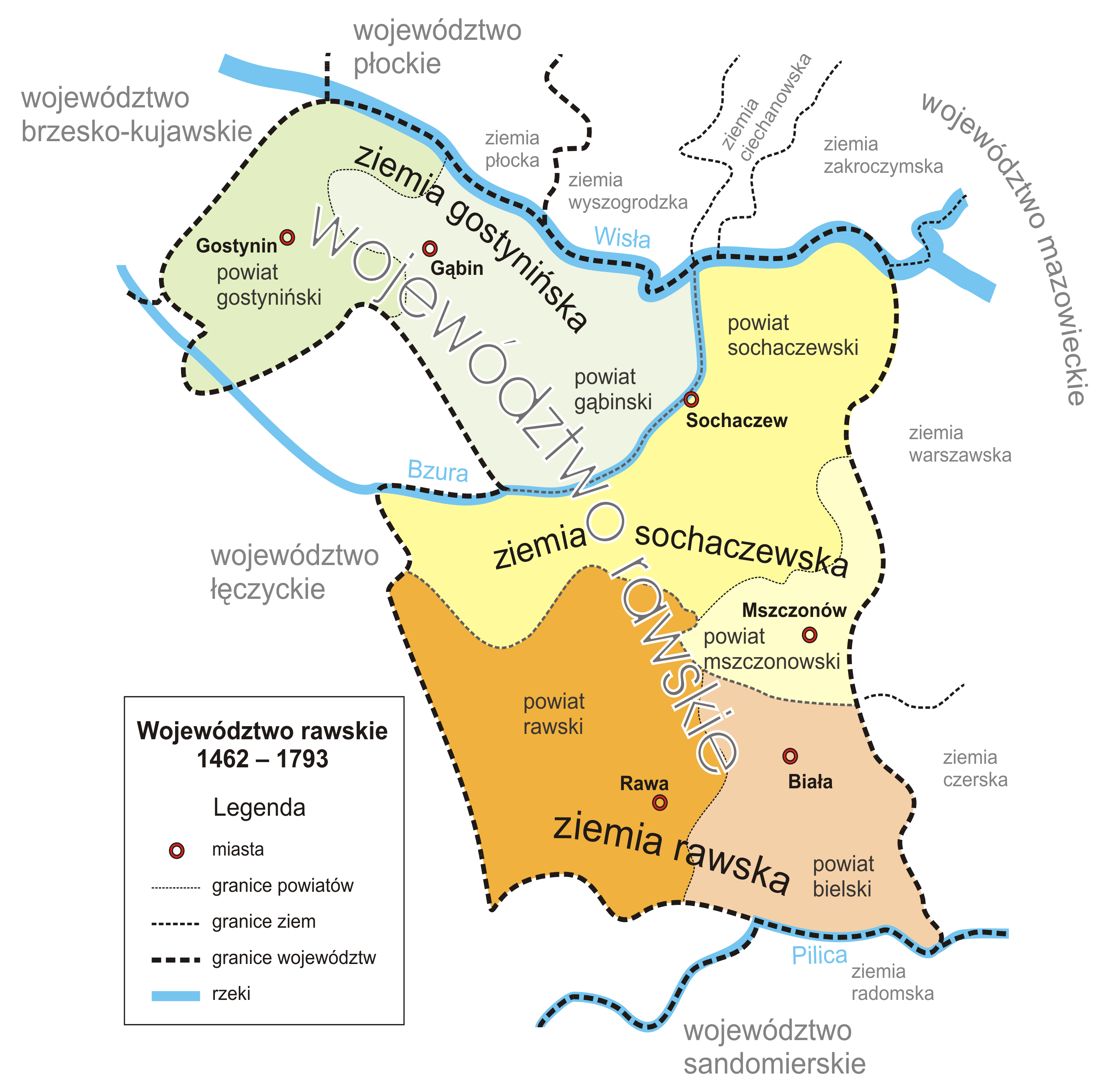
Counties of Rawa Voivodeship

== Administrative division ==
- Rawa Land (ziemia rawska, Rawa),
  - Rawa County
  - Biała Rawska County,
- Gostynin Land (ziemia gostynińska, Gostynin),
  - Gostynin County
  - Gąbin County,
- Sochaczew Land (ziema sochaczewska, Sochaczew),
  - Sochaczew County
  - Mszczonów County.

== Cities and towns ==
=== Biała County ===
- Biała
- Mogielnica
- Nowe Miasto

=== Gąbin County ===
- Gąbin
- Iłów
- Kiernozia
- Osmolin
- Pacyna

=== Gostynin County ===
- Gostynin
- Kutno
- Trębki

=== Mszczonów County ===
- Grodzisk
- Mszczonów

=== Rawa County ===
- Budziszewice
- Głowno
- Jeżów
- Rawa
- Skierniewice

=== Sochaczew County ===
- Bolimów
- Kampinos
- Łowicz
- Sochaczew
- Wiskitki

== Voivodes ==
- Mikołaj z Kutna 1465–1467
- Jan Grot z Nowego Miasta 1468–1489
- Andrzej Szczubioł 1489–1493
- Jakub Buczacki 1493–1496
- Andrzej Kucieński 1496–1504
- Piotr Prędota z Trzciany 1504–1518
- Jakub Gostomski 1518–1519
- Andrzej Kucieński 1519–1529
- Stanisław Kucieński 1529–1542
- Andrzej Sierpski 1542-?
- Anzelm Gostomski 1572–1588
- Stanisław Gostomski 1588-?
- Wojciech Wilkanowski ?
- Piotr Myszkowski 1597–1601
- Zygmunt Grudziński 1601–1618
- Stanisław Radziejowski 1618–1627
- Filip Wołucki 1627–1642
- Krzysztof Marcin Sułowski 1642–1644
- Andrzej Grudziński 1644–1650
- Łukasz Opaliński 1653–1654
- Aleksander Koryciński 1659-?
- Jan Wojciech Lipski 1676
- Hieronim Olszowski 1676
- Aleksander Załuski 1676–1692
- Aleksander Józef Załuski 1693–1720
- Andrzej Głębocki 1720–1735
- Stanisław Wincenty Jabłonowski 1735-1754
- Stanisław Świdziński 1754–1757
- Kazimierz Granowski 1757–1774
- Bazyli Walicki 1774-1789

== Sources ==
- Rawa Voivodeship, description by Zygmunt Gloger
