= Kietlanka, Węgrów County =

Hamlet in Masovian Voivodeship, Poland

Kietlanka
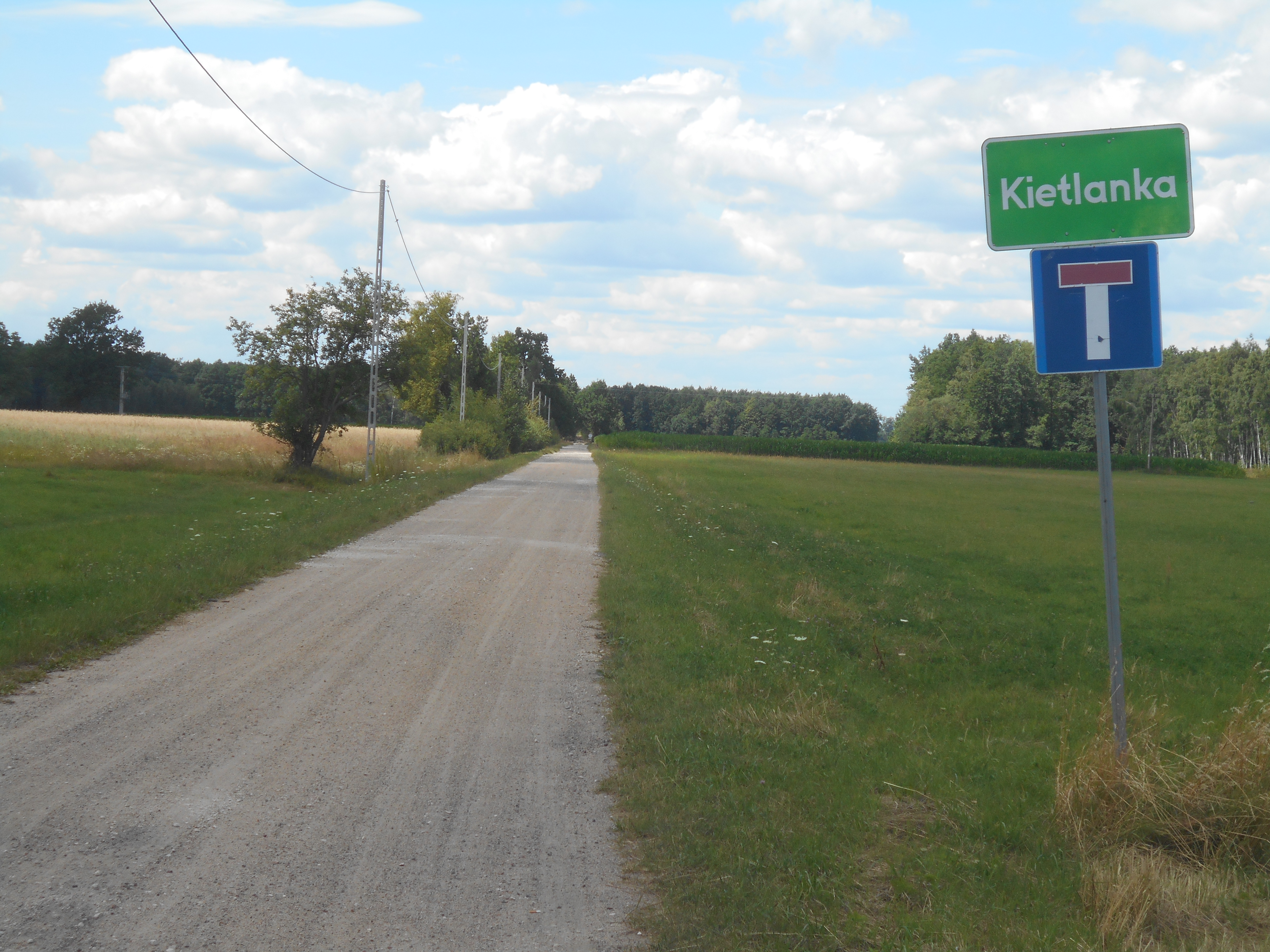
- Road in Kietlanka

- Location within Poland Location within Masovian Voivodeship
- Coordinates: 52°44′45″N 22°10′29″E
- Country: Poland
- Voivodeship: Masovian
- County: Węgrów
- Gmina: Korytnica
- Time zone: UTC+1 (CET)
  - Summer (DST): UTC+2 (CEST)
- Postal code: 07-323
- Car plates: WOR

Kietlanka (Polish: [kjɛˈtlaŋ.ka]) is a hamlet in the Masovian Voivodeship, Poland located in the Gmina Korytnica, Węgrów County.
