= Żelazów, Masovian Voivodeship =

Żelazów
- Village
- Location within Poland
- Coordinates: 52°24′8″N 21°52′57″E
- Country: Poland
- Voivodeship: Masovian
- County: Węgrów
- Gmina: Korytnica

Żelazów [ʐɛˈlazuf] is a village in the administrative district of Gmina Korytnica, within Węgrów County in Masovian Voivodeship, east-central Poland.

== History ==
The village has been in the past a temporary location of the administrative district of Jaczew County (Polish: Gmina). In 1975-1998 Żelazów was part of Siedlce Voivodeship.

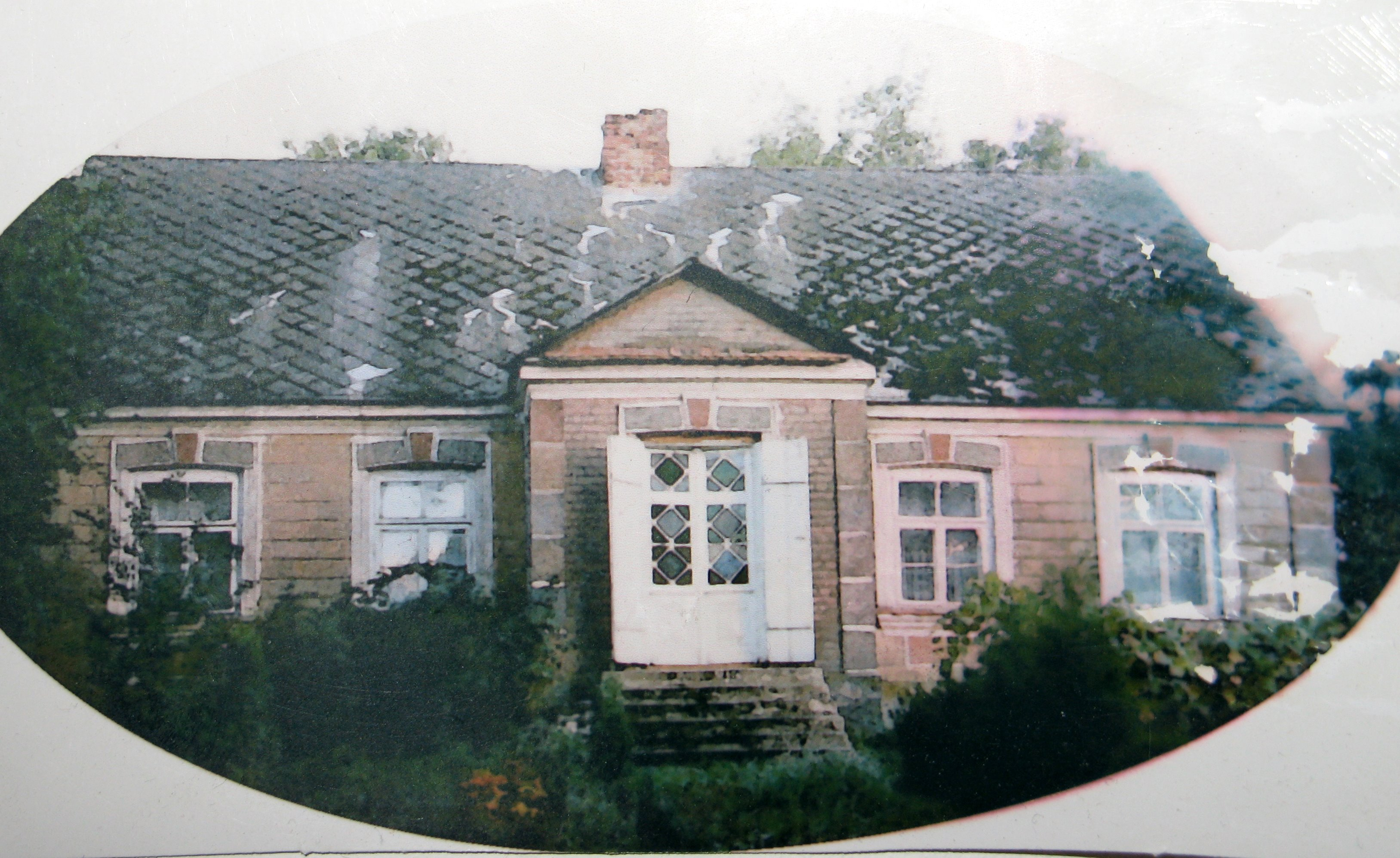
The oldest brick house in Żelazów, built in 1919
