= Zalesie, Gmina Sadowne =

Zalesie
- Village
- Location within Poland
- Coordinates: 52°39′N 21°46′E
- Country: Poland
- Voivodeship: Masovian
- County: Węgrów
- Gmina: Sadowne
- Population: 200

Zalesie [zaˈlɛɕɛ] is a village in the administrative district of Gmina Sadowne, within Węgrów County, Masovian Voivodeship, in east-central Poland.
