= Kolonia Sinołęka =

- Village
- Location within Poland
- Coordinates: 52°13′51″N 21°53′32″E
- Country: Poland
- Voivodeship: Masovian
- County: Węgrów
- Gmina: Grębków
- Population: 75
- Time zone: UTC+1 (CET)
  - Summer (DST): UTC+2 (CEST)
- Postal code: 07-110
- Area code: +48 25
- ISO 3166 code: POL
- Vehicle registration: WWE

Kolonia Sinołęka [kɔˈlɔɲa ɕinɔˈwɛnka] is a village in the administrative district of Gmina Grębków, within Węgrów County, Masovian Voivodeship, in east-central Poland.
