= Morzyczyn Włościański =

- Village
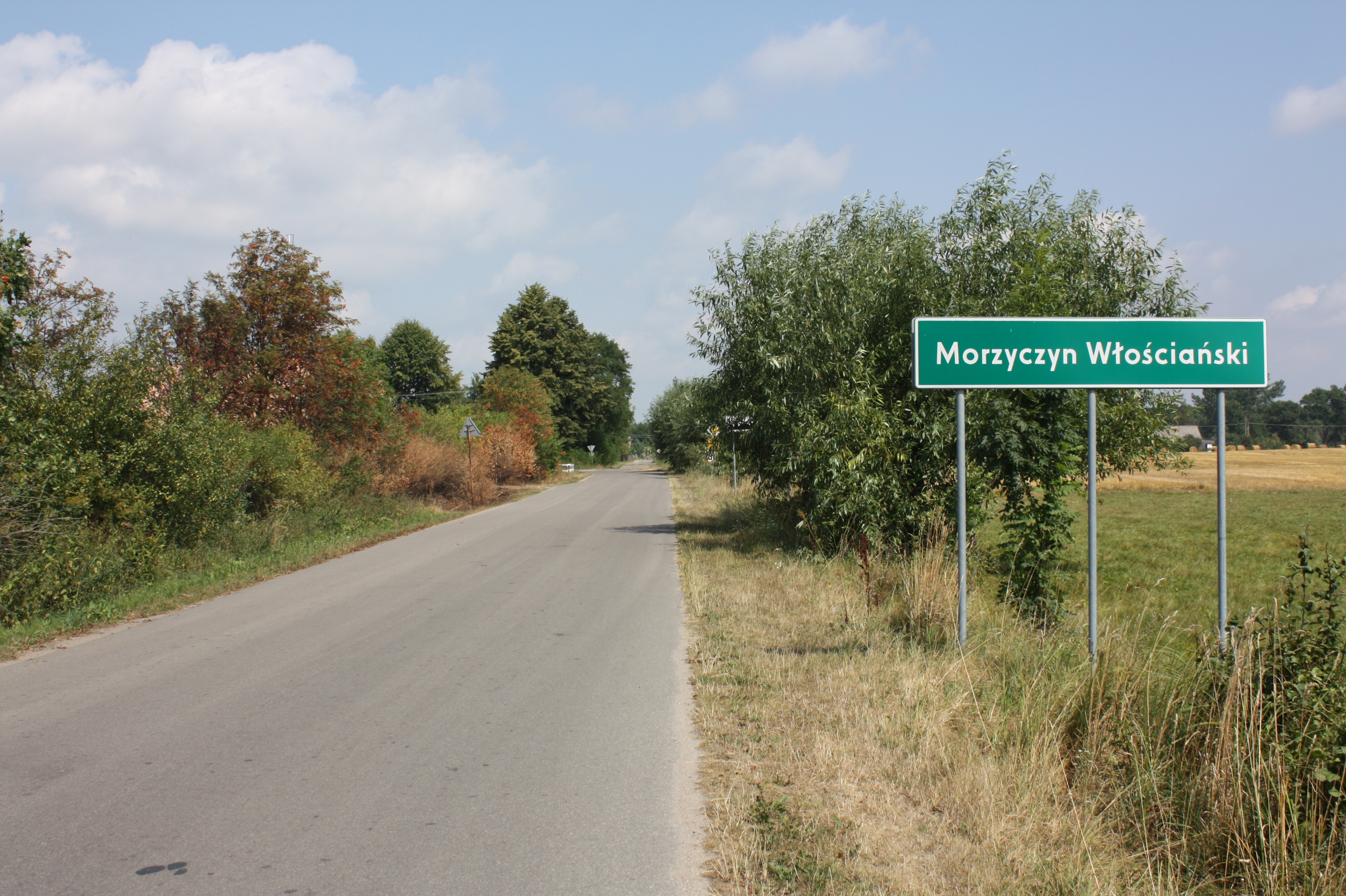

- Location within Poland
- Coordinates: 52°40′N 21°54′E
- Country: Poland
- Voivodeship: Masovian
- County: Węgrów
- Gmina: Sadowne

Morzyczyn Włościański (Polish pronunciation: [mɔˈʐɨtʂɨn vwɔɕˈtɕaj̃skʲi]) is a village in the administrative district of Gmina Sadowne, within Węgrów County, Masovian Voivodeship, in east-central Poland.
