= Sójkówek =

- Village
- Location within Poland
- Coordinates: 52°37′12″N 21°54′17″E
- Country: Poland
- Voivodeship: Masovian
- County: Węgrów
- Gmina: Sadowne

Sójkówek [sui̯ˈkuvɛk] is a village in the administrative district of Gmina Sadowne, within Węgrów County, Masovian Voivodeship, in east-central Poland.
