= Sokółka, Masovian Voivodeship =

Sokółka
- Village
- Location within Poland
- Coordinates: 52°37′N 21°53′E
- Country: Poland
- Voivodeship: Masovian
- County: Węgrów
- Gmina: Sadowne
- Time zone: UTC+1 (CET)
  - Summer (DST): UTC+2 (CEST)
- Vehicle registration: WWE

Sokółka [sɔˈkuu̯ka] is a village in the administrative district of Gmina Sadowne, within Węgrów County, Masovian Voivodeship, in east-central Poland.

Five Polish citizens were murdered by Nazi Germany in the village during World War II.
