= Jugi =

Jugi may refer to:

- Jugi, Poland, a village
- Jugi, Iran (disambiguation), several villages
- an alternative spelling of Jogi, the name of several South Asian communities

== See also ==
- Juggy (disambiguation)
- Jagi (disambiguation)
