= Gałki, Węgrów County =

Gałki
- Village
- Location within Poland
- Coordinates: 52°14′24″N 22°0′0″E
- Country: Poland
- Voivodeship: Masovian
- County: Węgrów
- Gmina: Grębków
- Population: 236
- Time zone: UTC+1 (CET)
  - Summer (DST): UTC+2 (CEST)
- Postal code: 07-110
- Area code: +48 25
- ISO 3166 code: POL
- Vehicle registration: WWE

Gałki [ˈɡau̯ki] is a village in the administrative district of Gmina Grębków, within Węgrów County, Masovian Voivodeship, in east-central Poland.

== History ==
The village was privately owned and belonged to the Gałecki family until the 18th century. Folwark Gałki was founded by the Popiel family at the end of the 18th century. Near the village there is a complex of several private breeding ponds established in the 1800s.
