= Grabiny, Masovian Voivodeship =

Grabiny
- Village
- Location within Poland
- Coordinates: 52°38′N 21°47′E
- Country: Poland
- Voivodeship: Masovian
- County: Węgrów
- Gmina: Sadowne

Grabiny [ɡraˈbinɨ] is a village in the administrative district of Gmina Sadowne, within Węgrów County, Masovian Voivodeship, in east-central Poland.
