= Szczurów =

- Village
- Location within Poland
- Coordinates: 52°22′N 21°50′E
- Country: Poland
- Voivodeship: Masovian
- County: Węgrów
- Gmina: Korytnica

Szczurów [ˈʂt͡ʂuruf] is a village in the administrative district of Gmina Korytnica, within Węgrów County, Masovian Voivodeship, in east-central Poland.

In 1975-1998 the town administratively belonged to the province of Siedlce.
