= Maksymilianów, Węgrów County =

Maksymilianów
- Village
- Location within Poland
- Coordinates: 52°27′9″N 21°46′24″E
- Country: Poland
- Voivodeship: Masovian
- County: Węgrów
- Gmina: Korytnica

Maksymilianów [maksɨmiˈljanuf] is a village in the administrative district of Gmina Korytnica, within Węgrów County, Masovian Voivodeship, in east-central Poland.
