= Złotki, Węgrów County =

Złotki
- Village
- Location within Poland
- Coordinates: 52°39′N 21°59′E
- Country: Poland
- Voivodeship: Masovian
- County: Węgrów
- Gmina: Sadowne

Złotki [ˈzwɔtki] is a village in the administrative district of Gmina Sadowne, within Węgrów County, Masovian Voivodeship, in east-central Poland.
