= Rostki, Węgrów County =

Rostki
- Village
- Location within Poland
- Coordinates: 52°28′30″N 22°02′50″E
- Country: Poland
- Voivodeship: Masovian
- County: Węgrów
- Gmina: Miedzna
- Population: 220

Rostki [ˈrɔstki] is a village in the administrative district of Gmina Miedzna, within Węgrów County, Masovian Voivodeship, in east-central Poland.
