= Wola Korytnicka =

- Village
- Location within Poland
- Coordinates: 52°25′N 21°49′E
- Country: Poland
- Voivodeship: Masovian
- County: Węgrów
- Gmina: Korytnica

Wola Korytnicka [ˈvɔla kɔrɨtˈnit͡ska] is a village in the administrative district of Gmina Korytnica, within Węgrów County, Masovian Voivodeship, in east-central Poland.
