= Żabokliki, Węgrów County =

Żabokliki
- Village
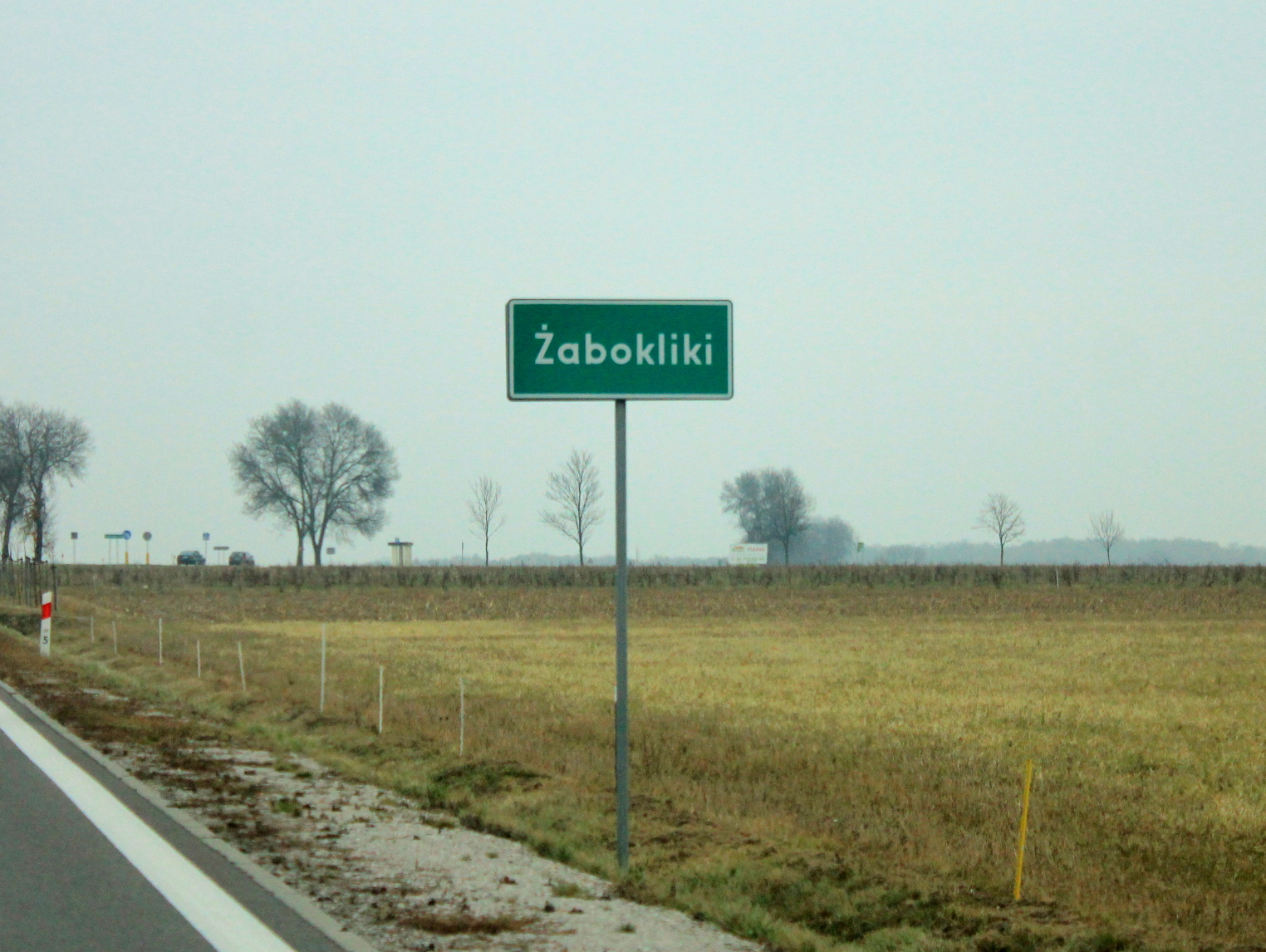

- Location within Poland
- Coordinates: 52°22′N 21°53′E
- Country: Poland
- Voivodeship: Masovian
- County: Węgrów
- Gmina: Korytnica

Żabokliki [ʐabɔˈkliki] is a village in the administrative district of Gmina Korytnica, within Węgrów County, Masovian Voivodeship, in east-central Poland.
