= Rabiany =

- Village
- Location within Poland
- Coordinates: 52°25′N 21°47′E
- Country: Poland
- Voivodeship: Masovian
- County: Węgrów
- Gmina: Korytnica

Population
  - Total: 275
- Time zone: UTC+1 (CET)
  - Summer (DST): UTC+2 (CEST)
- Vehicle registration: WWE

Rabiany [raˈbjanɨ] is a village in the administrative district of Gmina Korytnica, within Węgrów County, Masovian Voivodeship, in east-central Poland.

== History ==
Historically, Rabiany (historically also spelled Rąbiany or Rabiny) was established as the regional ancestral seat of a branch of the Rabiński (Rąbiński) noble family of the Łodzia coat of arms, who migrated to the area from Rąbiń in Wielkopolska and belonged to the local minor nobility (drobna szlachta). Early tax registers and ownership records from the 15th and 16th centuries document the village under noble management, closely tied to the local St. Lawrence Parish in nearby Korytnica.

Three Polish citizens were murdered by Nazi Germany in the village during World War II.
