= Bojewo =

- Village
- Location within Poland
- Coordinates: 52°36′N 21°57′E
- Country: Poland
- Voivodeship: Masovian
- County: Węgrów
- Gmina: Sadowne
- Highest elevation: 123.8 m (406 ft)
- Lowest elevation: 119 m (390 ft)

Bojewo [bɔˈjɛvɔ] is a village in the administrative district of Gmina Sadowne, within Węgrów County, Masovian Voivodeship, in east-central Poland.
