= Dąbrowa, Gmina Korytnica =

Dąbrowa
- Village
- Location within Poland
- Coordinates: 52°22′42″N 21°47′23″E
- Country: Poland
- Voivodeship: Masovian
- County: Węgrów
- Gmina: Korytnica
- Population: 98 (2,018)
- Time zone: UTC+1 (CET)
  - Summer (DST): UTC+2 (CEST)
- Postal code: 07-120
- Area code: +48 25
- ISO 3166 code: POL
- Vehicle registration: WWE

Dąbrowa [dɔmˈbrɔva] is a village in the administrative district of Gmina Korytnica, within Węgrów County, Masovian Voivodeship, in east-central Poland.

In 1975-1998, the town belonged administratively to the Siedlce Voivodeship.
