= Ugoszcz =

Ugoszcz may refer to the following places in Poland:

- Ugoszcz, Kuyavian-Pomeranian Voivodeship (north-central Poland)
- Ugoszcz, Masovian Voivodeship (east-central Poland)
- Ugoszcz, Pomeranian Voivodeship (north Poland)
