= Lipniki, Węgrów County =

Lipniki
- Village
- Location within Poland
- Coordinates: 52°26′N 21°48′E
- Country: Poland
- Voivodeship: Masovian
- County: Węgrów
- Gmina: Korytnica
- Time zone: UTC+1 (CET)
  - Summer (DST): UTC+2 (CEST)

Lipniki (Polish pronunciation: [lipˈɲikʲi]) is a village in the administrative district of Gmina Korytnica, within Węgrów County, Masovian Voivodeship, in east-central Poland.

Two Polish citizens were murdered by Nazi Germany in the village during World War II.
