= Rąbież, Gmina Korytnica =

Rąbież
- Village
- Location within Poland
- Coordinates: 52°23′25″N 21°53′40″E
- Country: Poland
- Voivodeship: Masovian
- County: Węgrów
- Gmina: Korytnica

Rąbież [ˈrɔmbjɛʂ] is a village in the administrative district of Gmina Korytnica, within Węgrów County, Masovian Voivodeship, in east-central Poland.
