= Glina, Węgrów County =

Glina
- Village
- Location within Poland
- Coordinates: 52°34′23″N 22°01′47″E
- Country: Poland
- Voivodeship: Masovian
- County: Węgrów
- Gmina: Miedzna

Glina [ˈɡlina] is a village in the administrative district of Gmina Miedzna, within Węgrów County, Masovian Voivodeship, in east-central Poland.
