= Stary Świętochów =

- Village
- Location within Poland
- Coordinates: 52°22′15″N 21°45′01″E
- Country: Poland
- Voivodeship: Masovian
- County: Węgrów
- Gmina: Korytnica
- Population: 90

Stary Świętochów (Polish pronunciation: [ˈstarɨ ɕfjɛnˈtɔxuf]) is a village in the administrative district of Gmina Korytnica, within Węgrów County, Masovian Voivodeship, in east-central Poland.
