= Kocielnik =

- Village
- Location within Poland
- Coordinates: 52°39′23″N 21°54′18″E
- Country: Poland
- Voivodeship: Masovian
- County: Węgrów
- Gmina: Sadowne
- Population: 210

Kocielnik [kɔˈt͡ɕɛlnik] is a village in the administrative district of Gmina Sadowne, within Węgrów County, Masovian Voivodeship, in east-central Poland.
