= Szynkarzyzna =

- Village
- Location within Poland
- Coordinates: 52°37′N 21°45′E
- Country: Poland
- Voivodeship: Masovian
- County: Węgrów
- Gmina: Sadowne
- Population: 470

Szynkarzyzna [ʂɨŋkaˈʐɨzna] is a village in the administrative district of Gmina Sadowne, within Węgrów County, Masovian Voivodeship, in east-central Poland.
