= Wielądki =

- Village
- Location within Poland
- Coordinates: 52°24′N 21°50′E
- Country: Poland
- Voivodeship: Masovian
- County: Węgrów
- Gmina: Korytnica

Wielądki [vjɛˈlɔntki] is a village in the administrative district of Gmina Korytnica, within Węgrów County, Masovian Voivodeship, in east-central Poland.

== History ==
A village of medieval origin. Most likely founded by a nobleman Nicholas Komorowski Wielądek, Ostoja coat of arms. The first mentions of Wielądki date back to 1487.

In the times of the Polish-Lithuanian Commonwealth (1569–1795) it was the property of the szlachta family Wielądek, Nałęcz coat of arms.

Franciszek Wielądek, the Minister of Transport of the Third Republic of Poland, was born in Wielądki in 1936.

The contemporary spelling variations of the descendants of Wielądki include Wielądek, Wielątek, Wielondek.

== Heritage ==
Prominent members of the family include:

- Wojciech Wincenty Wielądko (1749 – 1822), Polish nobleman, historian, poet
- Franciszek Wielądek (born in 1936), Minister of Transport of the III Republic of Poland, Polish mathematician, politician
