= Jagi =

Jagi may refer to:

- Jagi, Iran, a village
- Jagi (Fist of the North Star), a fictional character
- L. Jagi Lamplighter, American writer

== See also ==
- Jugi (disambiguation)
- Jaggi, a given name and surname
- Jõgi, Estonian surname
