= Żeleźniki, Masovian Voivodeship =

Żeleźniki
- Village
- Location within Poland
- Coordinates: 52°27′33″N 22°3′37″E
- Country: Poland
- Voivodeship: Masovian
- County: Węgrów
- Gmina: Miedzna

Żeleźniki [ʐɛlɛʑˈniki] is a village in the administrative district of Gmina Miedzna, within Węgrów County, Masovian Voivodeship, in east-central Poland.
