= Adampol (disambiguation) =

Adampol is a village in Turkey, founded by Polish settlers.

Adampol may also refer to the following villages in Poland:

- Adampol, Lublin Voivodeship (east Poland)
- Adampol, Węgrów County in Masovian Voivodeship (east-central Poland)
- Adampol, Wołomin County in Masovian Voivodeship (east-central Poland)
