= Poszewka =

- Village
- Location within Poland
- Coordinates: 52°27′N 22°1′E
- Country: Poland
- Voivodeship: Masovian
- County: Węgrów
- Gmina: Miedzna

Poszewka [pɔˈʂɛfka] is a village in the administrative district of Gmina Miedzna, within Węgrów County, Masovian Voivodeship, in east-central Poland.
