= Połazie Świętochowskie =

- Village
- Location within Poland
- Coordinates: 52°24′N 21°46′E
- Country: Poland
- Voivodeship: Masovian
- County: Węgrów
- Gmina: Korytnica

Połazie Świętochowskie (Polish pronunciation: [pɔˈwaʑɛ ɕfjɛntɔˈxɔfskʲɛ]) is a village in the administrative district of Gmina Korytnica, within Węgrów County, Masovian Voivodeship, in east-central Poland.
