= Roguszyn, Węgrów County =

Roguszyn
- Village
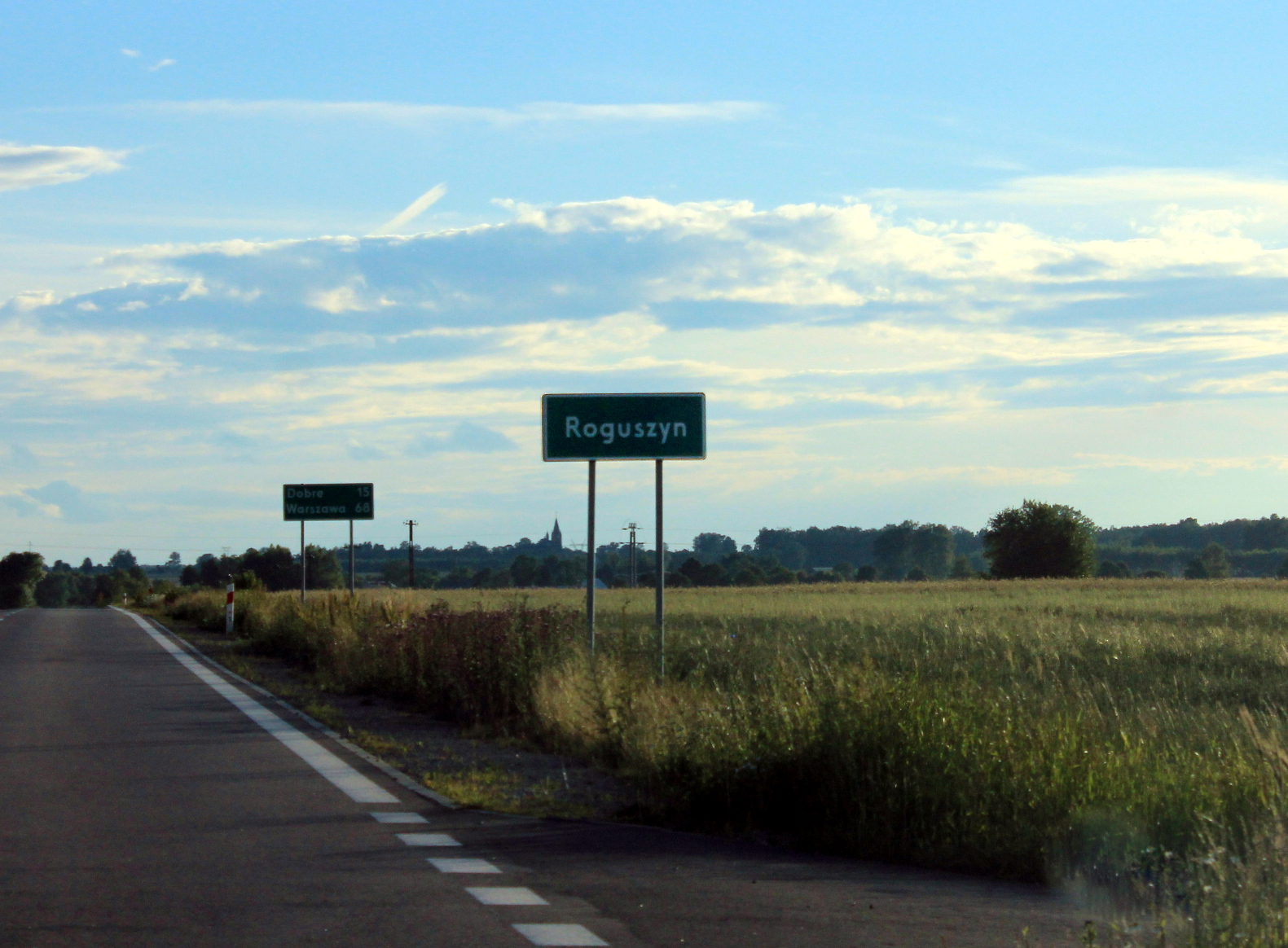

- Location within Poland
- Coordinates: 52°23′N 21°51′E
- Country: Poland
- Voivodeship: Masovian
- County: Węgrów
- Gmina: Korytnica

Roguszyn [rɔˈɡuʂɨn] is a village in the administrative district of Gmina Korytnica, within Węgrów County, Masovian Voivodeship, in east-central Poland.
