= Sadoleś =

- Village
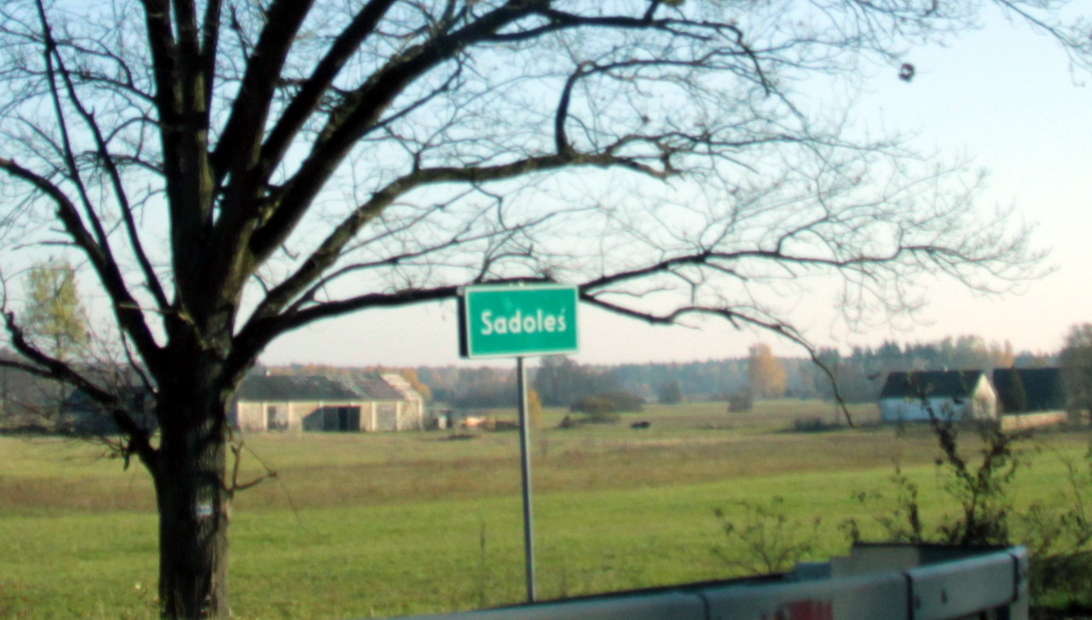

- Location within Poland
- Coordinates: 52°38′54″N 21°45′28″E
- Country: Poland
- Voivodeship: Masovian
- County: Węgrów
- Gmina: Sadowne

Sadoleś [saˈdɔlɛɕ] is a village in the administrative district of Gmina Sadowne, within Węgrów County, Masovian Voivodeship, in east-central Poland.
