= Wilczogęby =

- Village
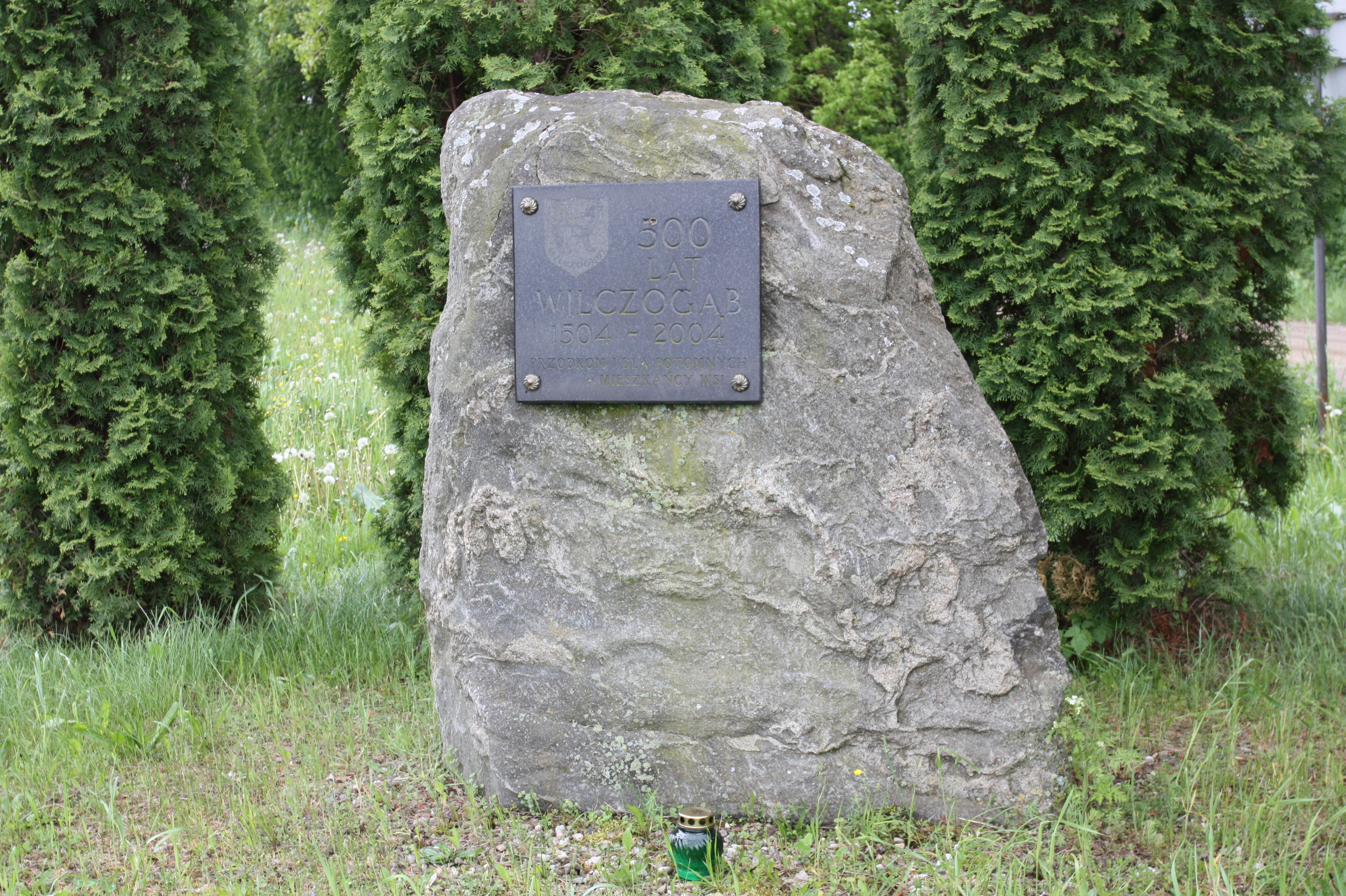
- A plaque commemorating 500 years of the village of Wilczogęby on a roadside stone

- Location within Poland
- Coordinates: 52°39′13″N 21°47′22″E
- Country: Poland
- Voivodeship: Masovian
- County: Węgrów
- Gmina: Sadowne
- Time zone: UTC+1 (CET)
  - Summer (DST): UTC+2 (CEST)

Wilczogęby [vilt͡ʂɔˈɡɛmbɨ] is a village in the administrative district of Gmina Sadowne, within Węgrów County, Masovian Voivodeship, in east-central Poland.

Five Polish citizens were murdered by Nazi Germany in the village during World War II.
