= Wrzoski, Masovian Voivodeship =

Wrzoski
- Village
- Location within Poland
- Coordinates: 52°29′N 22°7′E
- Country: Poland
- Voivodeship: Masovian
- County: Węgrów
- Gmina: Miedzna

Wrzoski [ˈvʐɔski] is a village in the administrative district of Gmina Miedzna, within Węgrów County, Masovian Voivodeship, in east-central Poland.
