= Nowy Świętochów =

- Village
- Location within Poland
- Coordinates: 52°25′43″N 21°42′52″E
- Country: Poland
- Voivodeship: Masovian
- County: Węgrów
- Gmina: Korytnica

Nowy Świętochów (Polish pronunciation: [ˈnɔvɨ ɕfjɛnˈtɔxuf]) is a village in the administrative district of Gmina Korytnica, within Węgrów County, Masovian Voivodeship, in east-central Poland.
