= Ziomaki, Węgrów County =

Ziomaki
- Village
- Location within Poland
- Coordinates: 52°18′00″N 21°59′36″E
- Country: Poland
- Voivodeship: Masovian
- County: Węgrów
- Gmina: Grębków

Population
  - Total: 137
- Time zone: UTC+1 (CET)
  - Summer (DST): UTC+2 (CEST)
- Postal code: 07-110
- Area code: +48 25
- ISO 3166 code: POL
- Vehicle registration: WWE

Ziomaki [ʑɔˈmaki] is a village in the administrative district of Gmina Grębków, within Węgrów County, Masovian Voivodeship, in east-central Poland.

Nine Polish citizens were murdered by Nazi Germany in the village during World War II.
