= Zakrzew, Węgrów County =

Zakrzew
- Village
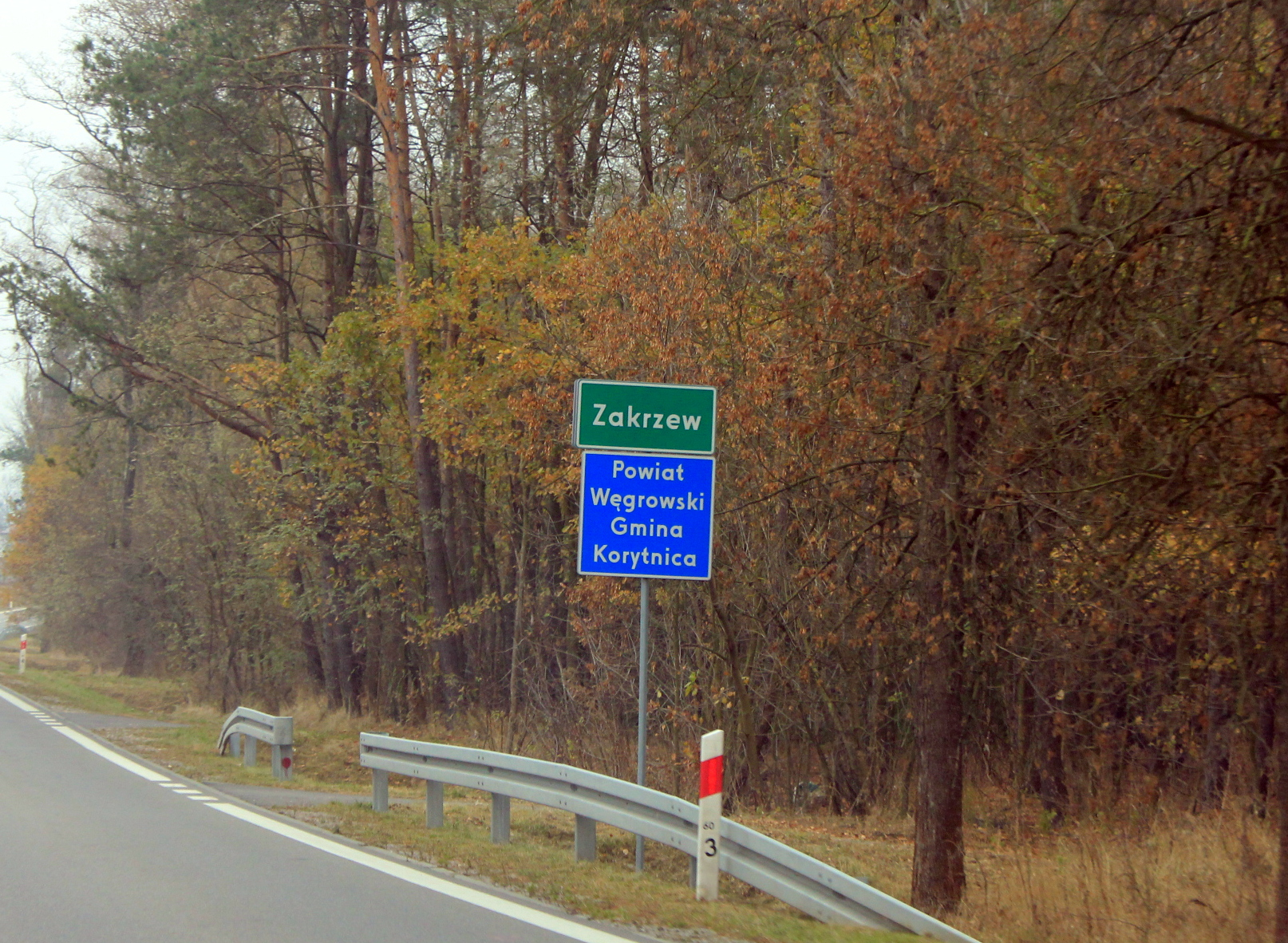

- Location within Poland
- Coordinates: 52°22′N 21°46′E
- Country: Poland
- Voivodeship: Masovian
- County: Węgrów
- Gmina: Korytnica

Zakrzew [ˈzakʂɛf] is a village in the administrative district of Gmina Korytnica, within Węgrów County, Masovian Voivodeship, in east-central Poland.
