= Kołodziąż, Węgrów County =

Kołodziąż
- Village
- Location within Poland
- Coordinates: 52°36′N 21°55′E
- Country: Poland
- Voivodeship: Masovian
- County: Węgrów
- Gmina: Sadowne

Kołodziąż [kɔˈwɔd͡ʑɔ̃ʂ] is a village in the administrative district of Gmina Sadowne, within Węgrów County, Masovian Voivodeship, in east-central Poland.
