= Orzełek, Węgrów County =

Orzełek
- Village
- Location within Poland
- Coordinates: 52°38′N 21°56′E
- Country: Poland
- Voivodeship: Masovian
- County: Węgrów
- Gmina: Sadowne
- Time zone: UTC+1 (CET)
  - Summer (DST): UTC+2 (CEST)

Orzełek [ɔˈʐɛwɛk] is a village in the administrative district of Gmina Sadowne, within Węgrów County, Masovian Voivodeship, in east-central Poland.

Five Polish citizens were murdered by Nazi Germany in the village during World War II.
