= Turna, Poland =

Turna
- Village
- Location within Poland
- Coordinates: 52°27′N 21°55′E
- Country: Poland
- Voivodeship: Masovian
- County: Węgrów
- Gmina: Korytnica
- Population: 550

Turna [ˈturna] is a village in the administrative district of Gmina Korytnica, within Węgrów County, Masovian Voivodeship, in east-central Poland.
