= Krupińskie =

- Village
- Location within Poland
- Coordinates: 52°36′N 21°48′E
- Country: Poland
- Voivodeship: Masovian
- County: Węgrów
- Gmina: Sadowne

Population
  - Total: 72 (2,021)
- Time zone: UTC+1 (CET)
  - Summer (DST): UTC+2 (CEST)

Krupińskie [kruˈpiɲskʲɛ] is a village in the administrative district of Gmina Sadowne, within Węgrów County, Masovian Voivodeship, in east-central Poland.

Five Polish citizens were murdered by Nazi Germany in the village during World War II.
