= Kupce =

- Village
- Location within Poland
- Coordinates: 52°27′N 21°45′E
- Country: Poland
- Voivodeship: Masovian
- County: Węgrów
- Gmina: Korytnica

Kupce [ˈkupt͡sɛ] is a village in the administrative district of Gmina Korytnica, within Węgrów County, Masovian Voivodeship, in east-central Poland.
