= Warchoły =

- Village
- Location within Poland
- Coordinates: 52°26′38″N 22°1′2″E
- Country: Poland
- Voivodeship: Masovian
- County: Węgrów
- Gmina: Miedzna

Warchoły [varˈxɔwɨ] is a village in the administrative district of Gmina Miedzna, within Węgrów County, Masovian Voivodeship, in east-central Poland.
