= Morzyczyn-Włóki =

- Village
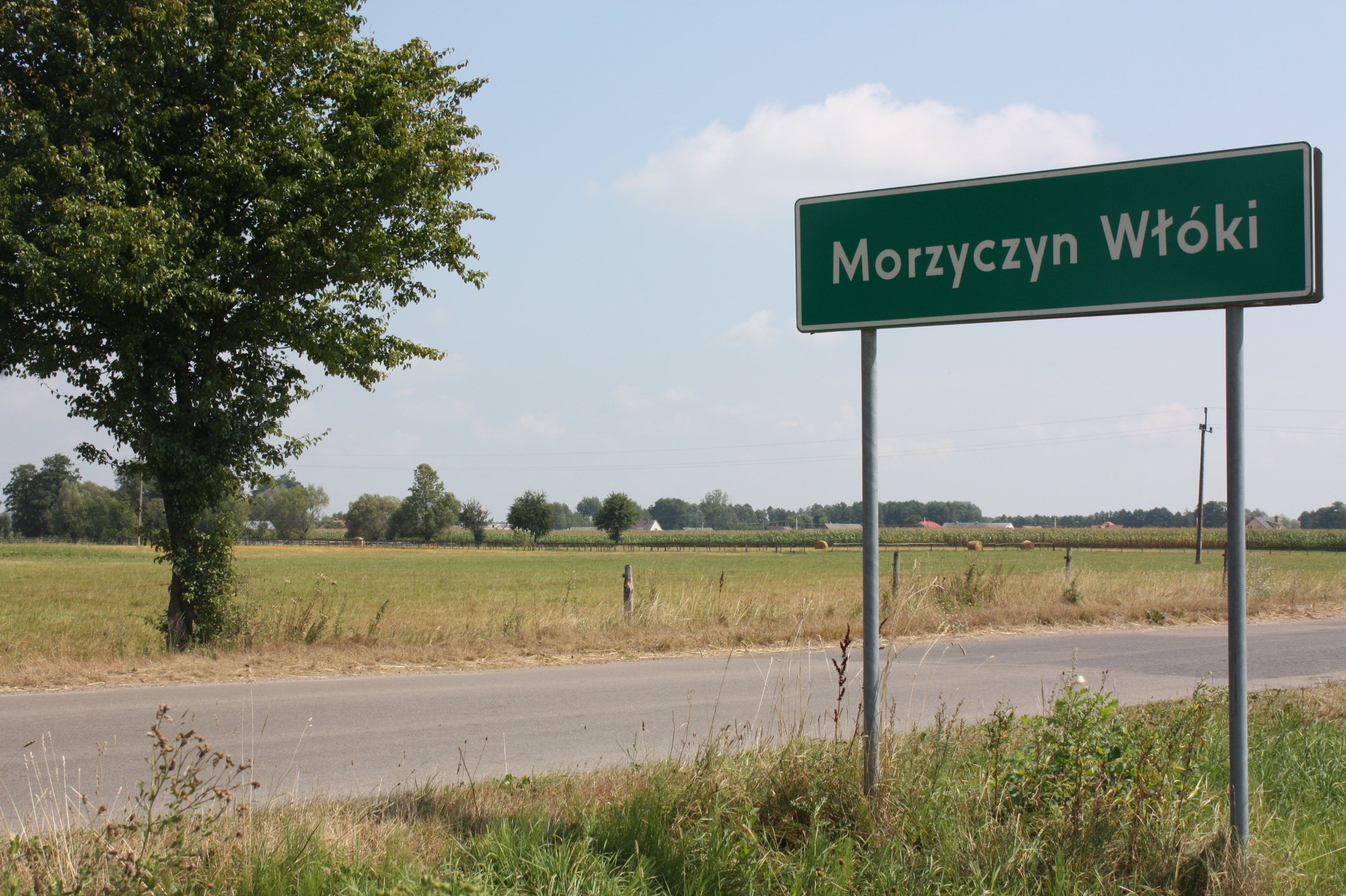
- Road sign in Morzyczyn-Włóki

- Location within Poland
- Coordinates: 52°40′28″N 21°54′53″E
- Country: Poland
- Voivodeship: Masovian
- County: Węgrów
- Gmina: Sadowne

Morzyczyn-Włóki [mɔˈʐɨt͡ʂɨn ˈvwuki] is a village in the administrative district of Gmina Sadowne, within Węgrów County, Masovian Voivodeship, in east-central Poland. It is located in the Central European Standard time zone. The village is roughly a one hour drive northeast of Warsaw.
