= Wola Orzeszowska =

- Village
- Location within Poland
- Coordinates: 52°27′N 22°8′E
- Country: Poland
- Voivodeship: Masovian
- County: Węgrów
- Gmina: Miedzna
- Elevation: 170 m (560 ft)
- Population: 200

Wola Orzeszowska [ˈvɔla ɔʐɛˈʂɔfska] is a village in the administrative district of Gmina Miedzna, within Węgrów County, Masovian Voivodeship, in east-central Poland.
