= Rażny =

- Village
- Location within Poland
- Coordinates: 52°39′4″N 21°44′18″E
- Country: Poland
- Voivodeship: Masovian
- County: Węgrów
- Gmina: Sadowne
- Population: 100

Rażny [ˈraʐnɨ] is a village in the administrative district of Gmina Sadowne, within Węgrów County, Masovian Voivodeship, in east-central Poland.
