= Decie =

- Village
- Location within Poland
- Coordinates: 52°22′58″N 21°51′43″E
- Country: Poland
- Voivodeship: Masovian
- County: Węgrów
- Gmina: Korytnica
- Population: 49 (2,018)
- Time zone: UTC+1 (CET)
  - Summer (DST): UTC+2 (CEST)
- Postal code: 07-120
- Area code: +48 25
- ISO 3166 code: POL
- Vehicle registration: WWE

Decie [ˈdɛt͡ɕɛ] is a village in the administrative district of Gmina Korytnica, within Węgrów County, Masovian Voivodeship, in east-central Poland.

In 1975-1998, the town administratively belonged to the Siedlce Voivodeship.
