= Zalesie, Gmina Korytnica =

Zalesie
- Village
- Location within Poland
- Coordinates: 52°24′30″N 21°53′13″E
- Country: Poland
- Voivodeship: Masovian
- County: Węgrów
- Gmina: Korytnica

Zalesie [zaˈlɛɕɛ] is a village in the administrative district of Gmina Korytnica, within Węgrów County, Masovian Voivodeship, in east-central Poland.
