= Górki Borze =

- Village
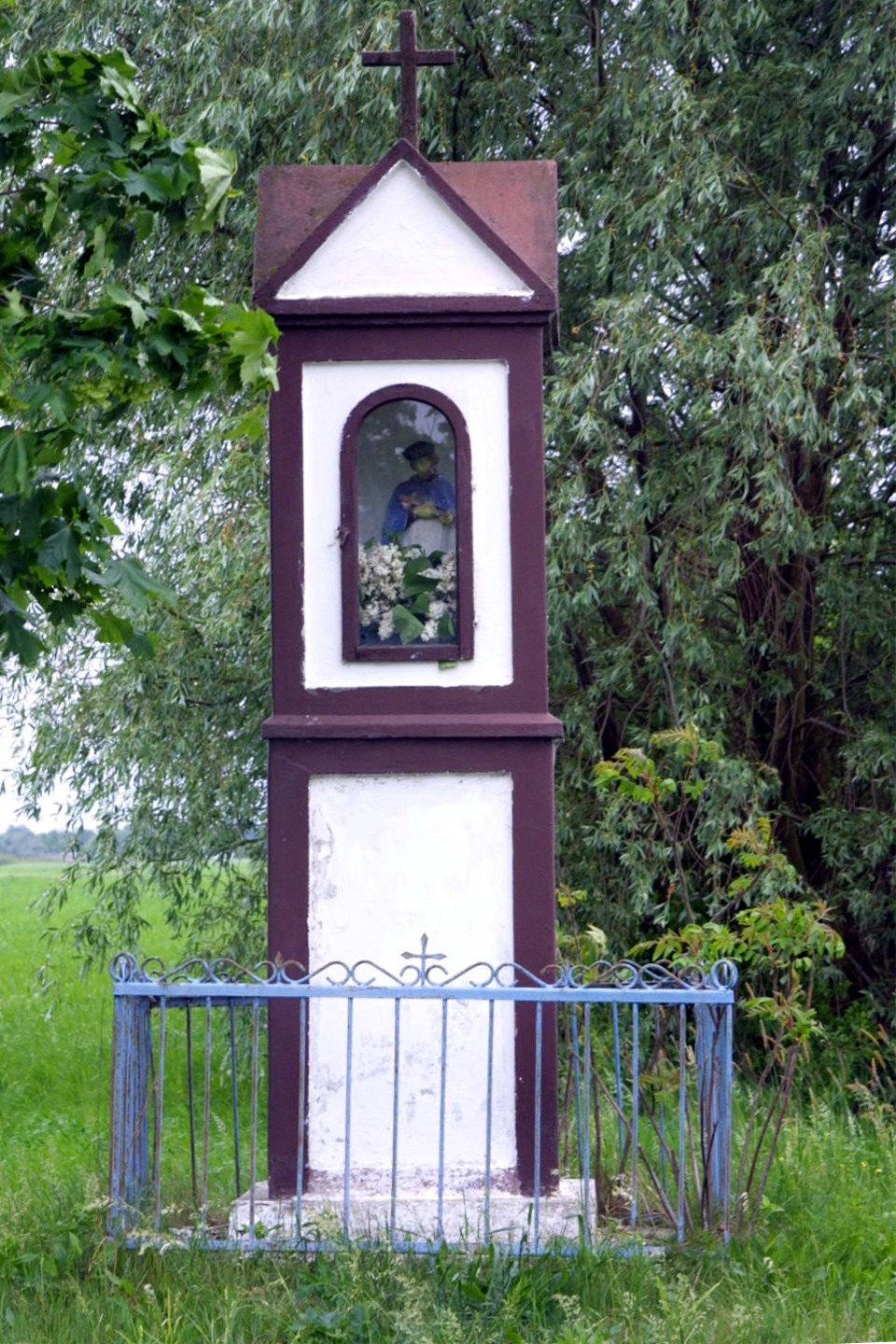
- A "kapliczka" in Górki Borze.

- Location within Poland
- Coordinates: 52°26′32″N 21°51′43″E
- Country: Poland
- Voivodeship: Masovian
- County: Węgrów
- Gmina: Korytnica
- Population: 165 (2,018)
- Time zone: UTC+1 (CET)
  - Summer (DST): UTC+2 (CEST)
- Postal code: 07-120
- Area code: +48 25
- ISO 3166 code: POL
- Vehicle registration: WWE

Górki Borze [ˈɡurki ˈbɔʐɛ] is a village in the administrative district of Gmina Korytnica, within Węgrów County, Masovian Voivodeship, in east-central Poland.

Zofia Węgierska, a Polish columnist and writer, comes from the village.

In 1975-1998, the town administratively belonged to the Siedlce Voivodeship.
