= Tchórzowa =

- Village
- Location within Poland
- Coordinates: 52°29′N 22°1′E
- Country: Poland
- Voivodeship: Masovian
- County: Węgrów
- Gmina: Miedzna
- Time zone: UTC+1 (CET)
  - Summer (DST): UTC+2 (CEST)

Tchórzowa [txuˈʐɔva] is a village in the administrative district of Gmina Miedzna, within Węgrów County, Masovian Voivodeship, in east-central Poland.

Six Polish citizens were murdered by Nazi Germany in the village during World War II.
