= Kołodziąż-Rybie =

- Village
- Location within Poland
- Coordinates: 52°36′52″N 21°54′49″E
- Country: Poland
- Voivodeship: Masovian
- County: Węgrów
- Gmina: Sadowne

Kołodziąż-Rybie [kɔˈwɔd͡ʑɔ̃ʂ ˈrɨbjɛ] is a village in the administrative district of Gmina Sadowne, within Węgrów County, Masovian Voivodeship, in east-central Poland.
