= Zarzetka =

- Village
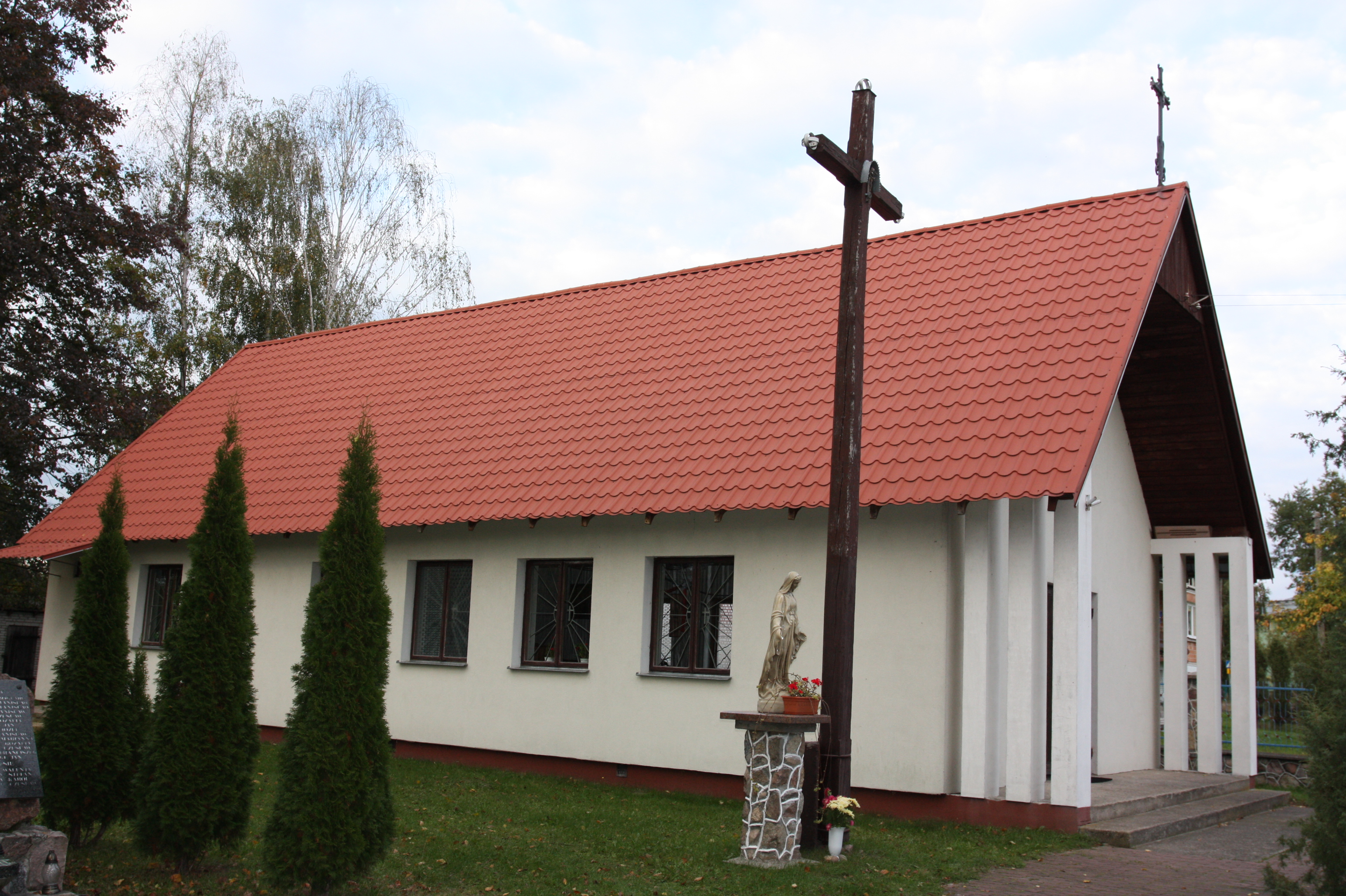
- Chapel in Zarzetka

- Location within Poland
- Coordinates: 52°38′12″N 21°46′12″E
- Country: Poland
- Voivodeship: Masovian
- County: Węgrów
- Gmina: Sadowne

Zarzetka [zaˈʐɛtka] is a village in the administrative district of Gmina Sadowne, within Węgrów County, Masovian Voivodeship, in east-central Poland.
