= Górki Średnie =

Village in Gmina Korytnica, Poland

- Village
- Location within Poland
- Coordinates: 52°26′37″N 21°52′20″E
- Country: Poland
- Voivodeship: Masovian
- County: Węgrów
- Gmina: Korytnica

Górki Średnie [ˈɡurki ˈɕrɛdɲɛ] is a village in the administrative district of Gmina Korytnica, within Węgrów County, Masovian Voivodeship, in east-central Poland.
