= Sadowne =

- Village
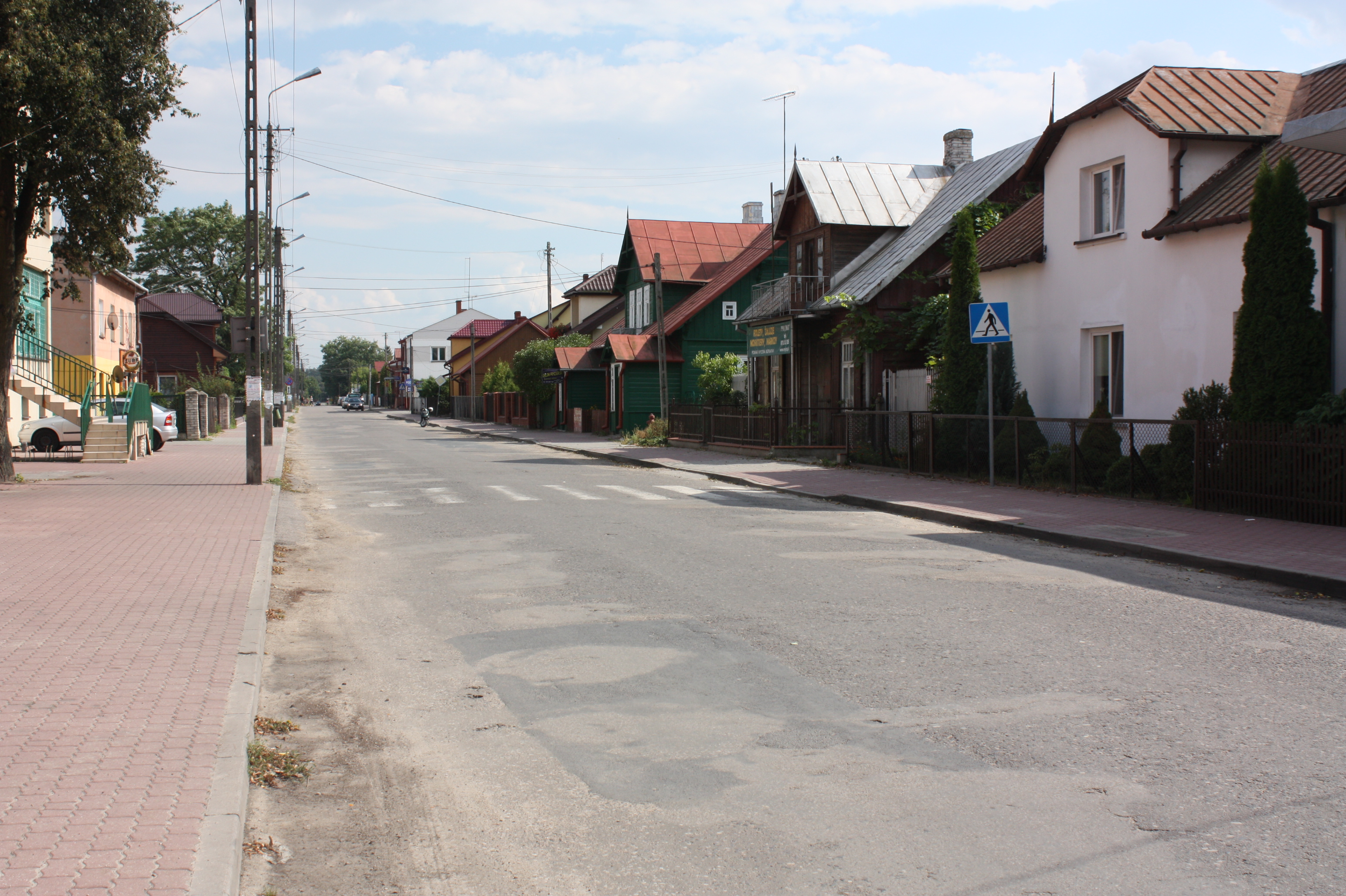
- Kościuszki street in Sadowne

- Coat of arms

- Location within Poland
- Coordinates: 52°39′N 21°51′E
- Country: Poland
- Voivodeship: Masovian
- County: Węgrów
- Gmina: Sadowne
- Population: 1,200

Sadowne [saˈdɔvnɛ] is a village in Węgrów County, Masovian Voivodeship, in east-central Poland. It is the seat of the Gmina (administrative district) called Gmina Sadowne.
