= Miedzna =

- Village
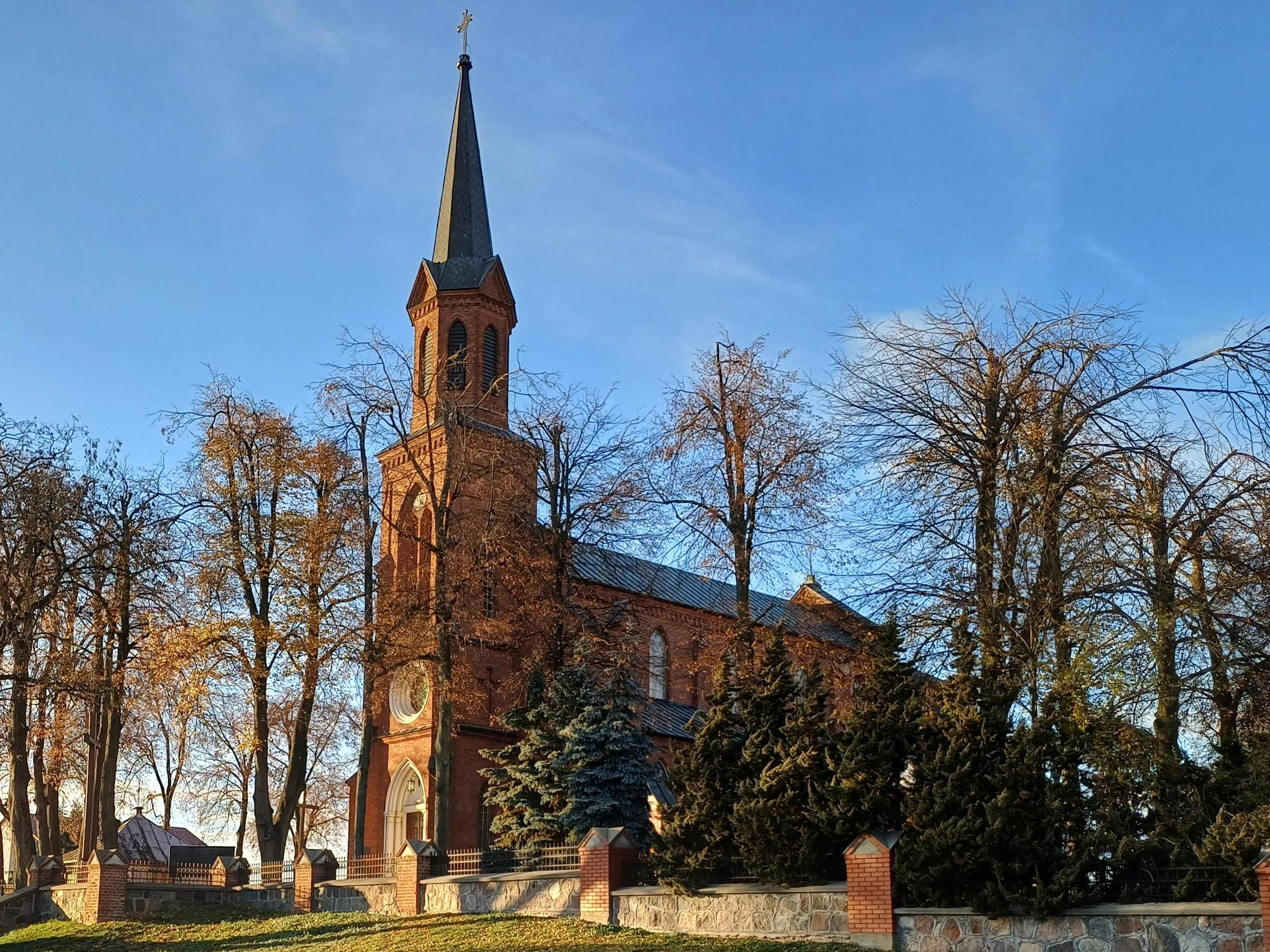
- Church of the Annunciation in Miedzna

- Coat of arms

- Location within Poland
- Coordinates: 52°28′2″N 22°5′22″E
- Country: Poland
- Voivodeship: Masovian
- County: Węgrów
- Gmina: Miedzna

Population
  - Total: 1,400
- Time zone: UTC+1 (CET)
  - Summer (DST): UTC+2 (CEST)
- Postal code: 07-106
- Vehicle registration: WWE

Miedzna [ˈmjɛd͡zna] is a village in Węgrów County, Masovian Voivodeship, in east-central Poland, in the historical region of Podlachia. It is the seat of the gmina (administrative district) called Gmina Miedzna.

== History ==
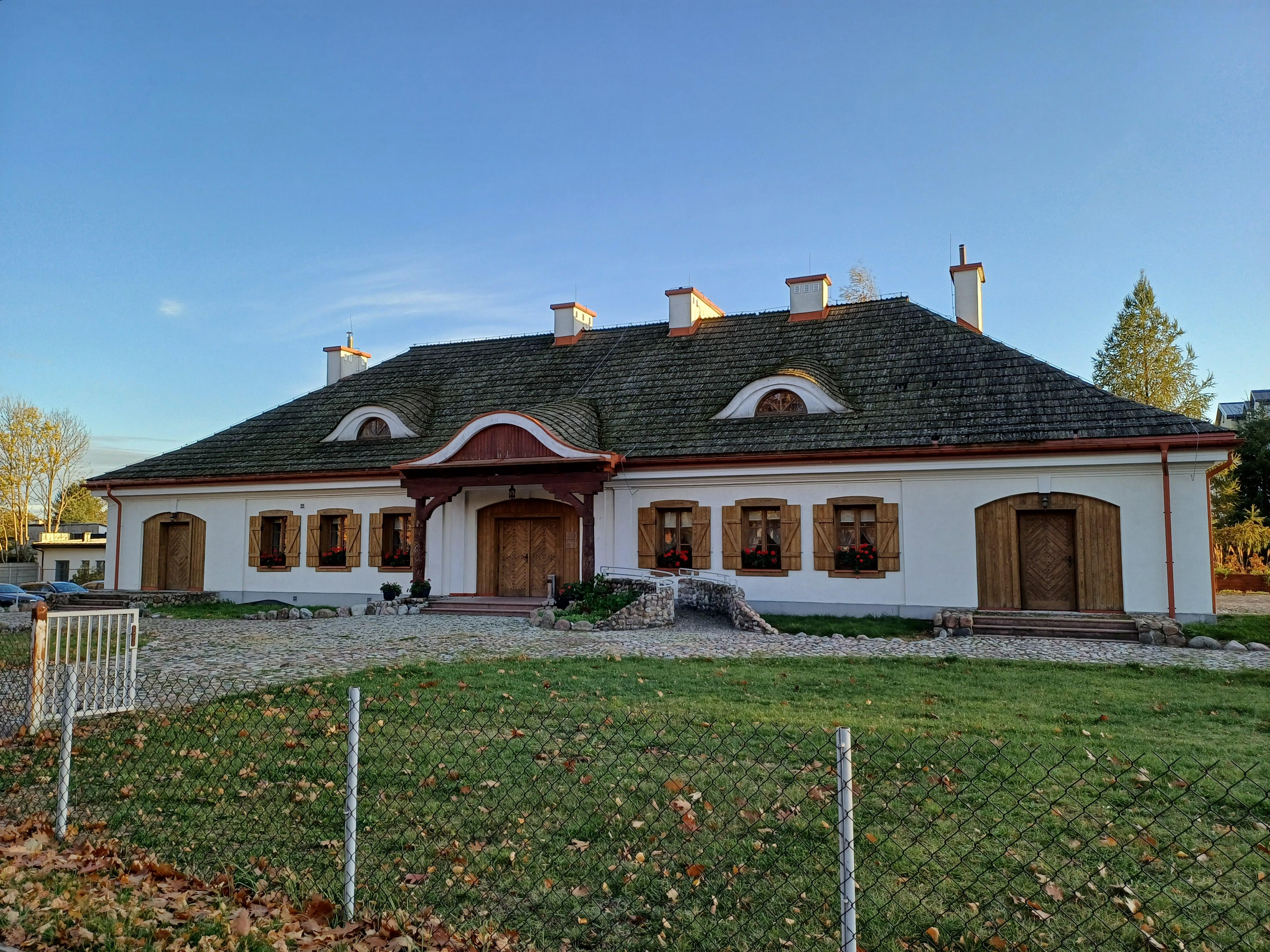
Old inn in Miedzna

Town rights were granted in 1470, revoked after 1500, and then restored in 1531. Miedzna, also known in the past as Międzylesie, was a private town administratively located in the Drohiczyn County in the Podlaskie Voivodeship in the Lesser Poland Province of the Kingdom of Poland.

Following the German-Soviet invasion of Poland, which started World War II in September 1939, Miedzna was occupied by Germany until 1944. The local Polish deputy police chief and another policeman were murdered by the Russians in the Katyn massacre in 1940.
