= Gmina Grębków =

Gmina Grębków Grębków Commune
- Gmina
- Coat of arms
- Interactive map of Gmina Grębków
- Coordinates (Grębków): 52°16′N 21°55′E
- Country: Poland
- Voivodeship: Masovian
- County: Węgrów
- Seat: Grębków

Area
  - Total: 130.75 km^{2} (50.48 sq mi)

Population (2013)
  - Total: 4,553
  - Density: 34.82/km^{2} (90.19/sq mi)
- Website: http://www.grebkow.pl/

Gmina Grębków is a rural gmina (administrative district) in Węgrów County, Masovian Voivodeship, in east-central Poland. Its seat is the village of Grębków, which lies approximately 16 kilometres (10 mi) south-west of Węgrów and 61 km (38 mi) east of Warsaw.

The gmina covers an area of 130.75 square kilometres (50.5 sq mi), and as of 2006 its total population is 4,629 (4,553 in 2013).

== Villages ==
Gmina Grębków contains the villages and settlements of Aleksandrówka, Chojeczno-Cesarze, Chojeczno-Sybilaki, Gałki, Grębków, Grodzisk, Jabłonna, Kolonia Sinołęka, Kopcie, Kózki, Leśnogóra, Nowa Sucha, Nowa Trzcianka, Ogródek, Oszczerze, Pobratymy, Podsusze, Polków-Daćbogi, Polków-Sagały, Proszew A, Proszew B, Słuchocin, Stara Sucha, Stara Trzcianka, Stawiska, Suchodół, Trzebucza, Żarnówka and Ziomaki.

== Neighbouring gminas ==
Gmina Grębków is bordered by the gminas of Kałuszyn, Kotuń, Liw, Mokobody and Wierzbno.
