= Ugoszcz, Masovian Voivodeship =

Ugoszcz
- Village
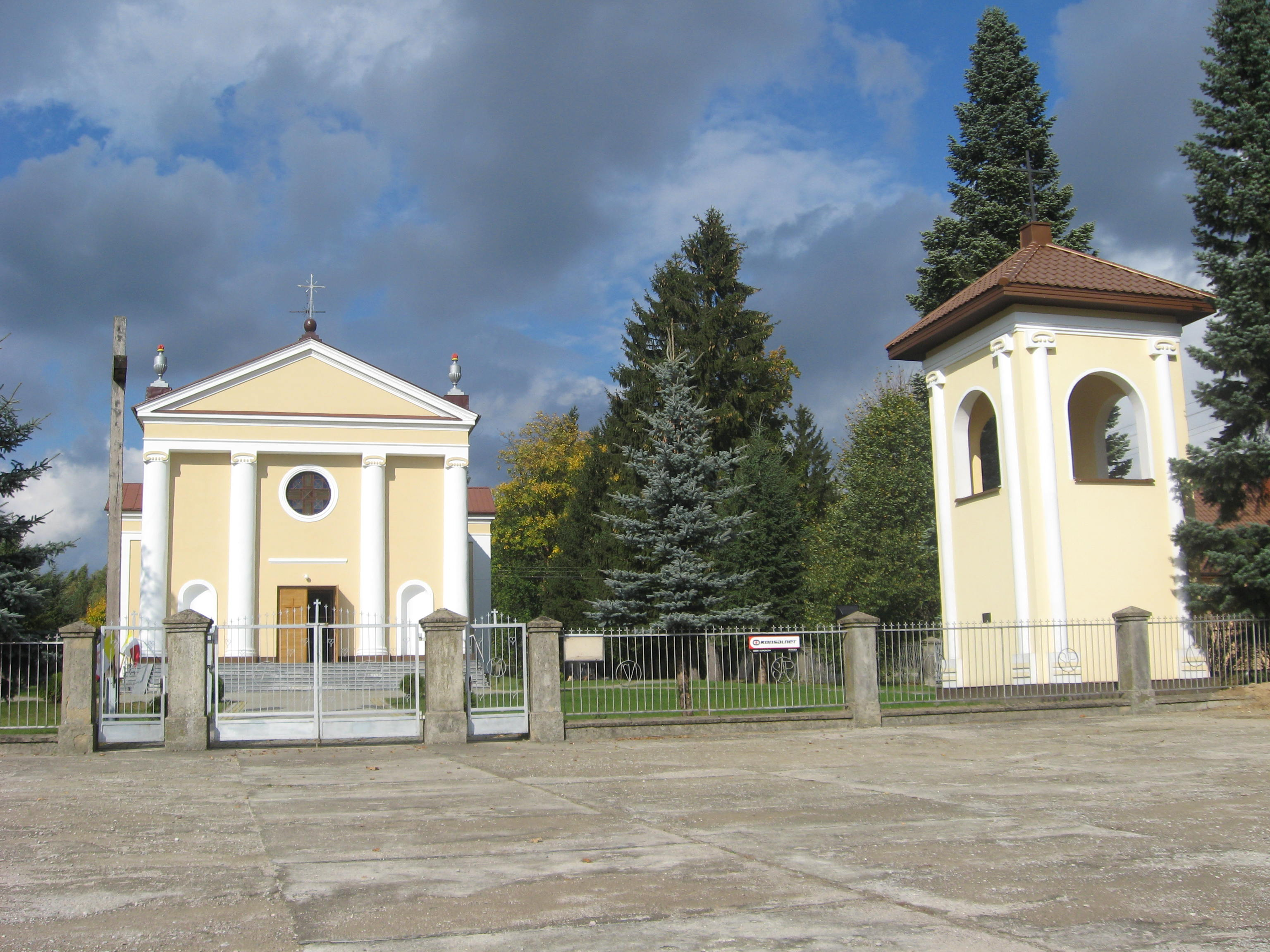
- Saint Anthony church in Ugoszcz

- Location within Poland
- Coordinates: 52°33′N 22°0′E
- Country: Poland
- Voivodeship: Masovian
- County: Węgrów
- Gmina: Miedzna
- Time zone: UTC+1 (CET)
  - Summer (DST): UTC+2 (CEST)
- Vehicle registration: WWE

Ugoszcz [ˈuɡɔʂt͡ʂ] is a village in the administrative district of Gmina Miedzna, within Węgrów County, Masovian Voivodeship, in east-central Poland.

== History ==
In 1827, the village had a population of 117.

Six Polish citizens were murdered by Nazi Germany in the village during World War II.
