= Gmina Korytnica =

Gmina Korytnica Korytnica Commune
- Gmina
- Flag Coat of arms
- Interactive map of Gmina Korytnica
- Coordinates (Korytnica): 52°25′N 21°51′E
- Country: Poland
- Voivodeship: Masovian
- County: Węgrów
- Seat: Korytnica

Area
  - Total: 180.54 km^{2} (69.71 sq mi)

Population (2013)
  - Total: 6,464
  - Density: 35.80/km^{2} (92.73/sq mi)

Gmina Korytnica is a rural gmina (administrative district) in Węgrów County, Masovian Voivodeship, in east-central Poland. Its seat is the village of Korytnica, which lies approximately 11 kilometres (7 mi) west of Węgrów and 60 km (37 mi) north-east of Warsaw.

The gmina covers an area of 180.54 square kilometres (69.7 sq mi), and as of 2006 its total population was 6,745 (6,464 in 2013).

== Villages ==
Gmina Korytnica contains the villages and settlements of Adampol, Bednarze, Chmielew, Czaple, Dąbrowa, Decie, Górki Borze, Górki Grubaki, Górki Średnie, Jaczew, Jugi, Kąty, Komory, Korytnica, Kruszew, Kupce, Leśniki, Lipniki, Maksymilianów, Nojszew, Nowy Świętochów, Paplin, Pniewnik, Połazie Świętochowskie, Rabiany, Rąbież, Roguszyn, Rowiska, Sekłak, Sewerynów, Stary Świętochów, Szczurów, Trawy, Turna, Wielądki, Wola Korytnicka, Wypychy, Żabokliki, Zakrzew, Zalesie and Żelazów.

== Neighbouring gminas ==
Gmina Korytnica is bordered by the gminas of Dobre, Jadów, Liw, Łochów, Sadowne, Stoczek, Strachówka and Wierzbno.
