= Jugi, Poland =

Jugi
- Village
- Location within Poland
- Coordinates: 52°26′49″N 21°43′42″E
- Country: Poland
- Voivodeship: Masovian
- County: Węgrów
- Gmina: Korytnica

Jugi [ˈjuɡi] is a village in the administrative district of Gmina Korytnica, within Węgrów County, Masovian Voivodeship, in east-central Poland.
