= Grębków =

- Village
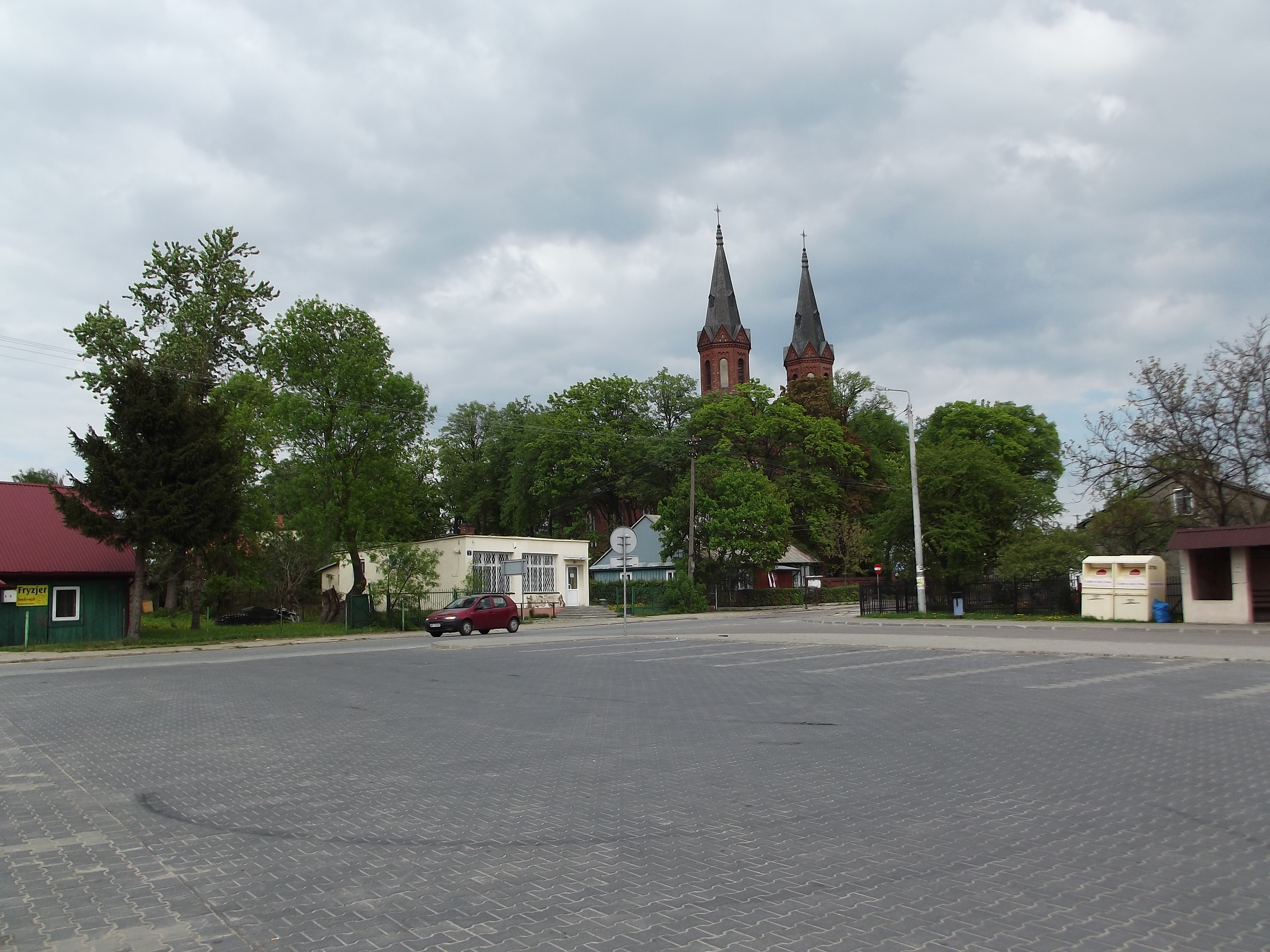
- Center of Grębków with the Saint Bartholomew church in the background

- Location within Poland
- Coordinates: 52°16′N 21°55′E
- Country: Poland
- Voivodeship: Masovian
- County: Węgrów
- Gmina: Grębków
- Population: 433
- Time zone: UTC+1 (CET)
  - Summer (DST): UTC+2 (CEST)
- Postal code: 07-110
- Area code: +48 25
- ISO 3166 code: POL
- Vehicle registration: WWE

Grębków [ˈɡrɛmpkuf] is a village in Węgrów County, Masovian Voivodeship, in east-central Poland. It is the seat of the gmina (administrative district) called Gmina Grębków.
