= Wielondek =

Polish nobility family

- Nałęcz coat of arms of the Wielondek family
- Country: Poland
- Founded: 1487
- Founder: Nicholas Komorowski Wielądek

The Wielondek family (Polish pronunciation: [vjɛˈlɔntɛk], Wielądko, Wielądek, z Wielądków) is an old Polish nobility family, Nałęcz coat of arms, that first began to gather prominence during the second half of the 15th century.

== History ==
The first records of Wielądki, the family ancestral seat, date back to 1487. It was most likely founded by a nobleman Nicholas Komorowski-Wielądek, Ostoja coat of arms.

During the period of the Polish-Lithuanian Commonwealth (1569–1795) the estate was the property of the szlachta family Wielądek, Nałęcz coat of arms.

== Coat of arms ==
The Wielondek family's coat of arms is Nałęcz, quoted by Jan Długosz as one of the oldest Polish coats of arms "Arma baronum Regni Poloniae”. with the earliest preserved seal dating back to 1293.

It is traditionally described as a silver shawl tied on a red background, symbolising unity and harmony. From the 17th century the crest features a young lady in a red dress standing on a jewel-encrusted crown and holding stag’s antlers. Some heraldic sources describe the dress as azure blue

== Notable bearers ==
- Wojciech Wincenty Wielądko
- Kazimierz Franciszek Czarnkowski
- Joseph Conrad Korzeniowski
- Fryderyk Józef Moszyński
- Count Edward Raczyński (1786–1845)
- Count Edward Aleksander Raczyński
- Count Edward Bernard Raczyński

== See also ==
- Szlachta

== Sources ==
- Wielądko, Wojciech Wincenty (1798). Heraldyka czyli opisanie familii, y krwi związku Szlachty Polskiey y W. X. Litt: z ich herbami. Warszawa.
- Piekosiński, Franciszek (1899). Heraldyka polska wieków średnich. Kraków: Akademia Umiejętności.
- Gajl, Tadeusz (2007). Herbarz polski od średniowiecza do XX wieku. Ponad 4500 herbów szlacheckich 37 tysięcy nazwisk 55 tysięcy rodów. L&L.
- Celichowski, Zygmunt (1885). Jan Długosz, "Insignia seu clenodia regis et regni Poloniae.Z kodeksu kórnickiego.". Poznań.
- Potocki, Wacław (1696). Poczet herbów szlachty Korony Polskiey i Wielkiego Xsięstwa Litewskiego. Kraków. p. 191.
- Chrząński, Stanisław Teodor (1909). Tablice odmian herbowych. Juliusz Karol Ostrowski.
- Znamierowski, Alfred (2004). Herbarz rodowy. Warszawa: Świat Książki. p. 134. ISBN 83-7391-166-9.
