= Korytnica, Węgrów County =

Korytnica
- Village
- Location within Poland
- Coordinates: 52°25′N 21°51′E
- Country: Poland
- Voivodeship: Masovian
- County: Węgrów
- Gmina: Korytnica
- Population: 860

Korytnica [kɔrɨtˈnit͡sa] is a village in Węgrów County, Masovian Voivodeship, in east-central Poland. It is the seat of the gmina (administrative district) called Gmina Korytnica.
