= Juggy =

Juggy may refer to:

- a member of the dance group in the American TV show The Man Show
- Juggy D (born 1981), British bhangra singer
- Juggy Murray (1923–2005), American rhythm and blues music producer
- Christa Hughes, also known as KK Juggy, Australian singer

== See also ==
- Juggi (disambiguation)
- Jugi (disambiguation)
