= Gmina Miedzna =

Gmina Miedzna Miedzna Commune
- Gmina
- Coat of arms
- Interactive map of Gmina Miedzna
- Coordinates (Miedzna): 52°28′2″N 22°5′22″E
- Country: Poland
- Voivodeship: Masovian
- County: Węgrów
- Seat: Miedzna

Area
  - Total: 115.78 km^{2} (44.70 sq mi)

Population (2013)
  - Total: 4,033
  - Density: 34.83/km^{2} (90.22/sq mi)

Gmina Miedzna is a rural gmina (administrative district) in Węgrów County, Masovian Voivodeship, in east-central Poland. Its seat is the village of Miedzna, which lies approximately 9 kilometres (6 mi) north-east of Węgrów and 80 km (50 mi) east of Warsaw.

The gmina covers an area of 115.78 square kilometres (44.7 sq mi), and as of 2006 its total population is 4,102 (4,033 in 2013).

== Villages ==
Gmina Miedzna contains the villages and settlements of Glina, Miedzna, Międzyleś, Orzeszówka, Poszewka, Rostki, Tchórzowa, Ugoszcz, Warchoły, Wola Orzeszowska, Wrotnów, Wrzoski, Żeleźniki and Zuzułka.

== Neighbouring gminas ==
Gmina Miedzna is bordered by the town of Węgrów and by the gminas of Kosów Lacki, Liw, Sokołów Podlaski and Stoczek.
