= Jagi-ye Sarhadi =

Jagi-ye Sarhadi جگي سرحدئ
- Village
- Location within Iran
- Coordinates: 26°35′27″N 58°29′14″E
- Country: Iran
- Province: Hormozgan
- County: Bashagard
- Bakhsh: Gafr and Parmon
- Rural District: Gafr and Parmon

Population (2006)
  - Total: 86
- Time zone: UTC+3:30 (IRST)
  - Summer (DST): UTC+4:30 (IRDT)

Jagi-ye Sarhadi (Persian: جگي سرحدئ, also Romanized as Jagī-ye Sarḥadi; also known as Jagī) is a village in Gafr and Parmon Rural District, Gafr and Parmon District, Bashagard County, Hormozgan Province, Iran. At the 2006 census, its population was 86, in 21 families.
