= Gmina Sadowne =

Gmina Sadowne Sadowne Commune
- Gmina
- Coat of arms
- Interactive map of Gmina Sadowne
- Coordinates (Sadowne): 52°39′N 21°51′E
- Country: Poland
- Voivodeship: Masovian
- County: Węgrów
- Seat: Sadowne

Area
  - Total: 144.72 km^{2} (55.88 sq mi)

Population (2013)
  - Total: 6,066
  - Density: 41.92/km^{2} (108.6/sq mi)
- Website: http://www.sadowne.pl/

Gmina Sadowne is a rural gmina (administrative district) in Węgrów County, Masovian Voivodeship, in east-central Poland. Its seat is the village of Sadowne, which lies approximately 30 kilometres (19 mi) north of Węgrów and 76 km (47 mi) north-east of Warsaw.

The gmina covers an area of 144.72 square kilometres (55.9 sq mi), and as of 2006 its total population is 6,270 (6,066 in 2013).

== Villages ==
Gmina Sadowne contains the villages and settlements of Bojewo, Grabiny, Kocielnik, Kołodziąż, Kołodziąż-Rybie, Kolonia Złotki, Krupińskie, Morzyczyn Włościański, Morzyczyn-Włóki, Ocięte, Orzełek, Płatkownica, Rażny, Sadoleś, Sadowne, Sójkówek, Sokółka, Szynkarzyzna, Wilczogęby, Zalesie, Zarzetka, Zieleniec and Złotki.

== Neighbouring gminas ==
Gmina Sadowne is bordered by the gminas of Brańszczyk, Brok, Kosów Lacki, Łochów, Małkinia Górna and Stoczek.
