= Węgrów County =

Węgrów County Powiat węgrowski
- County
- Flag Coat of arms

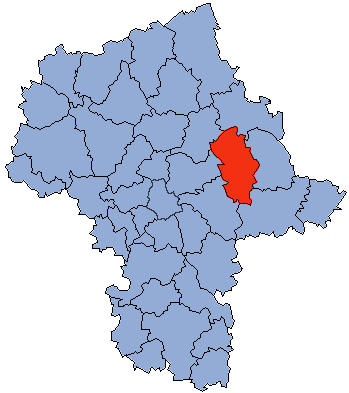
- Location within the voivodeship

- Division into gminas
- Coordinates (Węgrów): 52°24′N 22°1′E
- Country: Poland
- Voivodeship: Masovian
- Seat: Węgrów
- Gminas: Total 9 (incl. 1 urban): Węgrów; Gmina Grębków; Gmina Korytnica; Gmina Liw; Gmina Łochów; Gmina Miedzna; Gmina Sadowne; Gmina Stoczek; Gmina Wierzbno

Area
  - Total: 1,219.18 km^{2} (470.73 sq mi)

Population (2019)
  - Total: 66,037
  - Density: 54.165/km^{2} (140.29/sq mi)
  - Urban: 19,453
  - Rural: 46,584
- Car plates: WWE
- Website: www.powiatwegrowski.pl

Węgrów County (Polish: powiat węgrowski) is a unit of territorial administration and local government (powiat) in Masovian Voivodeship, east-central Poland. It came into being on January 1, 1999, as a result of the Polish local government reforms passed in 1998. Its administrative seat and largest town is Węgrów, which lies 73 kilometres (45 mi) east of Warsaw. The only other town in the county is Łochów, lying 26 km (16 mi) north-west of Węgrów.

The county covers an area of 1,219.18 square kilometres (470.7 sq mi). As of 2019, its total population is 66,037, out of which the population of Węgrów is 12,628, that of Łochów is 6,825, and the rural population is 46,584.

== Neighbouring counties ==
Węgrów County is bordered by Ostrów County to the north, Sokołów County to the east, Siedlce County to the south, Mińsk County to the south-west, and Wołomin County and Wyszków County to the west.

== Administrative divisions ==
The county is subdivided into nine gminas (one urban, one urban-rural and seven rural). These are listed in the following table, in descending order of population.

Gmina	Type	Area (km^{2})	Population (2019)	Seat
Gmina Łochów	urban-rural	195.0	17,908	Łochów
Węgrów	urban	35.5	12,628	Węgrów
Gmina Liw	rural	169.6	7,397	Węgrów *
Gmina Korytnica	rural	180.5	6,221	Korytnica
Gmina Sadowne	rural	144.7	5,861	Sadowne
Gmina Stoczek	rural	144.3	4,967	Stoczek
Gmina Grębków	rural	130.8	4,451	Grębków
Gmina Miedzna	rural	115.8	3,842	Miedzna
Gmina Wierzbno	rural	103.1	2,762	Wierzbno
* seat not part of the gmina
