= Albert Hugo Schuster =

Nazi war criminal (1912 - 1973)

- A photoshopped image of Schuster’s face, provided by court officials during his trial
- Born: February 13, 1912; Plauen, German Empire
- Died: May 31, 1973 (aged 61); Leipzig Prison, East Germany
- Other name: The Butcher of the Łysogóry
- Political party: Nazi Party
- Status: Executed by shooting
- Motive: Nazism; Sadism
- Convictions: War crimes Crimes against humanity
- Penalty: Death

Details
- Victims: 400+
- Span of crimes: 1941–1944
- Country: Belarus and Poland
- Date apprehended: December 1970
- Military career
- Allegiance: Nazi Germany
- Branch: Schutzstaffel
- Rank: Obersturmführer
- Unit: Ordnungspolizei

Albert Hugo Schuster (February 13, 1912 – May 31, 1973) was a Nazi war criminal who was responsible for police units in occupied Poland during World War II. He was notorious for his brutality, earning the nickname "The Butcher of the Łysogóry". Schuster avoided detection after the war. After Polish investigators reopened an active search for Nazi war criminals, they discovered Schuster, who was now living in East Germany. Schuster was arrested and put on trial for his crimes by an East German court. He was found guilty, sentenced to death, and executed in 1973.

== Early life and crimes ==
Schuster was born in Plauen in 1912. He joined the Nazi Party in 1933. In 1941, he graduated from the Ordnungspolizei school in Buchenwald. He was deployed to Belarus with the task of fighting guerrillas, shooting Jews whom he had helped select. In the spring of 1943, he was sent to the Świętokrzyskie Mountains. There, he became known as the "Butcher of the Łysogóry" for his brutality.

Schuster commanded the 62nd Motorized Gendarmerie Regiment. The group used carts instead of motor vehicles so they could surprise attack their targets. After a failed attempt by partisans to destroy his post, Schuster moved to the St. Catherine monastery, believing Poles would be less likely to shoot at a church. He tortured and murdered approximately 80 people in the monastery's proximity. In addition, Schuster went on "pacifications" in numerous areas, and many more in surrounding villages. He murdered hundreds of people across multiple villages. On one occasion, he burned two children alive.

Between March and July 1943, Schuster and his men murdered over 400 people. They killed 35 people combined in the villages of Paprocice, Płucki, and Zamkowa Wola. They also murdered 9 people in Bartoszowiny, 10 in Szklana Huta, 11 in Jeziorko, 4 in Celiny, 3 in Wojciechów, 2 in Hucisko, 8 in Psary Podlesie, 39 in Bodzentyn, 2 in Klucznik, 7 in Szafranki, 21 in Wola Szczygiełkowa, 28 in Dębno, 4 in Dębno Hary, 16 in Klonów, 9 in Kakonin, and 28 in Krajno.

When carrying out a village "pacification", Schuster would have the population chased into one area and then have his men read out a list of names. Those named were then killed. Sometimes, random people were shot. Victims were forced to dig their own graves in advance. Schuster justified his actions as being necessary to combat forest gangs.

In January 1944, Schuster went on a "rally of death" in the Opoczno area. Driving from village to village, he and his men kidnapped, robbed, tortured, and killed people who were unlucky enough to be in his way.

After being ambushed by a Home Army unit led by Witold Kucharski near the village of Ojrzeń, 12 of Schuster's men were killed and Schuster himself lost an eye. Fifteen local people were killed in retaliation. In January 1945, Schuster left for Germany on sick leave. He was awarded the War Merit Cross, and the Iron Cross (second class). After the war, Schuster was arrested on suspicion of war crimes, but released due to a lack of evidence.

== Postwar ==
Schuster settled in Raschau, East Germany, after the war. In 1951, he was hired by the Stasi as an informant. In 1964, he was awarded the Medal for Faithful Service in the National People's Army. In 1967, a Polish war crimes commission, led by Andrzej Jankowski, conducted an investigation into Schuster. They finished their investigation in 1968. Officials then sent a letter to West Germany about Schuster, after which Jankowski learned that Schuster was still alive, but was living in East Germany. In 1969, Jankowski informed East German officials about Schuster, prompting the Stasi to cease contact with him. In December 1970, Schuster was arrested and accused of "joining the system of fascist mass extermination and of having committed war crimes and crimes against humanity. As an officer of the fascist gendarmerie and leader of a motorized train, he organized, ordered and carried out the arrests, ill-treatment and shooting of women, children and men in occupied areas during the Second World War." Schuster was put on trial in Chemnitz.

Jankowski was allowed to participate in Schuster's interrogation and provided assistance to Polish witnesses questioned by the local prosecutor's office. Schuster's trial started in January 1973. Schuster attempted to defer blame to the Gestapo for the shootings. At one point during his trial, Wacław Dziuba, a surviving witness, said he had been saved by an unexpected act of mercy by one of Schuster's men. Dziuba had survived the initial massacre when the bullet only grazed his neck. One of Schuster's men noticed he was still alive, but instead of finishing him off, whispered to him "Lay still, everyone's dead."

At this, Schuster suddenly stood up and shouted "The witness is lying, it's impossible. My gendarmes were so disciplined that no one would allow himself to be so disloyal. This is slander. This cannot be true, because my soldiers were exactly following their orders, killing those forest bandits."

The presiding judge responded by mentioning the name of one of Schuster's victims, Wanda Piwowarczyk. Piwowarczyk was a two-year-old girl whom Schuster had personally executed as she was crying and hugging her mother. Schuster waited for Piwowarczyk's mother to recover from the shock of watching her daughter being murdered, then smiled at the woman and shot her in the head. She fell down while still holding her daughter in her arms. Dziuba witnessed the entire chain of events.

The judge asked Schuster if Wanda Piwowarczyk was a bandit. Schuster went silent. He was found guilty of participating in the rounding and deportation of Jews in the Belarusian town of Novogrudok and murdering of at least 400 villagers in Poland, and sentenced to death. Schuster was shot at Leipzig Prison in 1973. His body was cremated and buried in an unmarked grave. In 1994, an unknown party filed a rehabilitation request on Schuster's behalf. However, the petition only succeeded in having his death sentence posthumously reduced to life in prison.
