= Trzcianka (disambiguation) =

Trzcianka is a town in the Greater Poland Voivodeship (west-central Poland).

Trzcianka may also refer to:

- Trzcianka, Kuyavian-Pomeranian Voivodeship (north-central Poland)
- Trzcianka, Sokółka County in Podlaskie Voivodeship (north-east Poland)
- Trzcianka, Suwałki County in Podlaskie Voivodeship (north-east Poland)
- Trzcianka, Łódź Voivodeship (central Poland)
- Trzcianka, Kielce County in Świętokrzyskie Voivodeship (south-central Poland)
- Trzcianka, Staszów County in Świętokrzyskie Voivodeship (south-central Poland)
- Trzcianka, Ciechanów County in Masovian Voivodeship (east-central Poland)
- Trzcianka, Gmina Sobolew in Masovian Voivodeship (east-central Poland)
- Trzcianka, Gmina Wilga in Masovian Voivodeship (east-central Poland)
- Trzcianka, Mława County in Masovian Voivodeship (east-central Poland)
- Trzcianka, Przasnysz County in Masovian Voivodeship (east-central Poland)
- Trzcianka, Wyszków County in Masovian Voivodeship (east-central Poland)
- Trzcianka, Nowy Tomyśl County in Greater Poland Voivodeship (west-central Poland)
- Trzcianka, Pomeranian Voivodeship (north Poland)
