= Cząstków =

Cząstków may refer to the following places:

- Cząstków, Konin County in Greater Poland Voivodeship (central Poland)
- Cząstków, Koło County in Greater Poland Voivodeship (central Poland)
- Cząstków, Świętokrzyskie Voivodeship (south-central Poland)
