= Nowa Zbelutka =

- Village
- Location within Poland
- Coordinates: 50°43′35″N 21°8′11″E
- Country: Poland
- Voivodeship: Świętokrzyskie
- County: Kielce
- Gmina: Łagów
- Population: 252

Nowa Zbelutka [ˈnɔva zbɛˈlutka] is a village in the administrative district of Gmina Łagów, within Kielce County, Świętokrzyskie Voivodeship, in south-central Poland. It lies approximately 7 km (4 mi) south-east of Łagów and 41 km (25 mi) south-east of the regional capital Kielce.
