= Bobrowa =

Bobrowa may refer to the following places:

- Bobrowa, Łódź Voivodeship (central Poland)
- Bobrowa, Podlaskie Voivodeship (north-east Poland)
- Bobrowa, Subcarpathian Voivodeship (south-east Poland)
- Bobrowa, Opole Voivodeship (south-west Poland)
