= Kuczków =

Kuczków may refer to the following places:

- Kuczków, Kutno County in Łódź Voivodeship (central Poland)
- Kuczków, Łowicz County in Łódź Voivodeship (central Poland)
- Kuczków, Świętokrzyskie Voivodeship (south-central Poland)
- Kuczków, Greater Poland Voivodeship (west-central Poland)
