= Pokrzywianka, Kielce County =

Pokrzywianka
- Village
- Location within Poland
- Coordinates: 50°53′38″N 21°8′8″E
- Country: Poland
- Voivodeship: Świętokrzyskie
- County: Kielce
- Gmina: Nowa Słupia
- Population: 300 (2,015)

Pokrzywianka [pɔkʂɨˈvjaŋka] is a village in the administrative district of Gmina Nowa Słupia, within Kielce County, Świętokrzyskie Voivodeship, in south-central Poland. It lies approximately 5 km (3 mi) north-east of Nowa Słupia and 37 km (23 mi) east of the regional capital Kielce.
