= Włochy (disambiguation) =

Włochy may also refer to:

- Włochy, a district in the city of Warsaw, Poland
  - Włochy (neighbourhood), a neighbourhood within the city district
  - New Włochy, a neighbourhood within the city district
  - Old Włochy, a neighbourhood within the city district
- Włochy, Kielce County , a village in Świętokrzyskie Voivodeship, Poland
- Włochy, Pińczów County, a village in Świętokrzyskie Voivodeship, Poland
- Włochy, Opole Voivodeship, a village in Opole Voivodeship, Poland
- Włochy, a name for the country of Italy in Polish language (see *Walhaz for etymology)
