= Wiśniowa, Kielce County =

Wiśniowa
- Village
- Location within Poland
- Coordinates: 50°47′53″N 21°5′28″E
- Country: Poland
- Voivodeship: Świętokrzyskie
- County: Kielce
- Gmina: Łagów
- Population: 548

Wiśniowa [viɕˈɲɔva] is a village in the administrative district of Gmina Łagów, within Kielce County, Świętokrzyskie Voivodeship, in south-central Poland. It lies approximately 3 km (2 mi) north of Łagów and 35 km (22 mi) east of the regional capital Kielce.
