= Małacentów =

- Village
- Location within Poland
- Coordinates: 50°48′13″N 21°1′59″E
- Country: Poland
- Voivodeship: Świętokrzyskie
- County: Kielce
- Gmina: Łagów
- Population: 67

Małacentów [mawaˈt͡sɛntuf] is a village in the administrative district of Gmina Łagów, within Kielce County, Świętokrzyskie Voivodeship, in south-central Poland. It lies approximately 5 km (3 mi) north-west of Łagów and 31 km (19 mi) east of the regional capital Kielce.
