= Serwis =

- Village
- Location within Poland
- Coordinates: 50°53′16″N 21°5′15″E
- Country: Poland
- Voivodeship: Świętokrzyskie
- County: Kielce
- Gmina: Nowa Słupia
- Population: 290

Serwis [ˈsɛrvis] is a village in the administrative district of Gmina Nowa Słupia, within Kielce County, Świętokrzyskie Voivodeship, in south-central Poland. It lies approximately 3 km (2 mi) north of Nowa Słupia and 34 km (21 mi) east of the regional capital Kielce.
