= Ruda, Kielce County =

Ruda
- Village
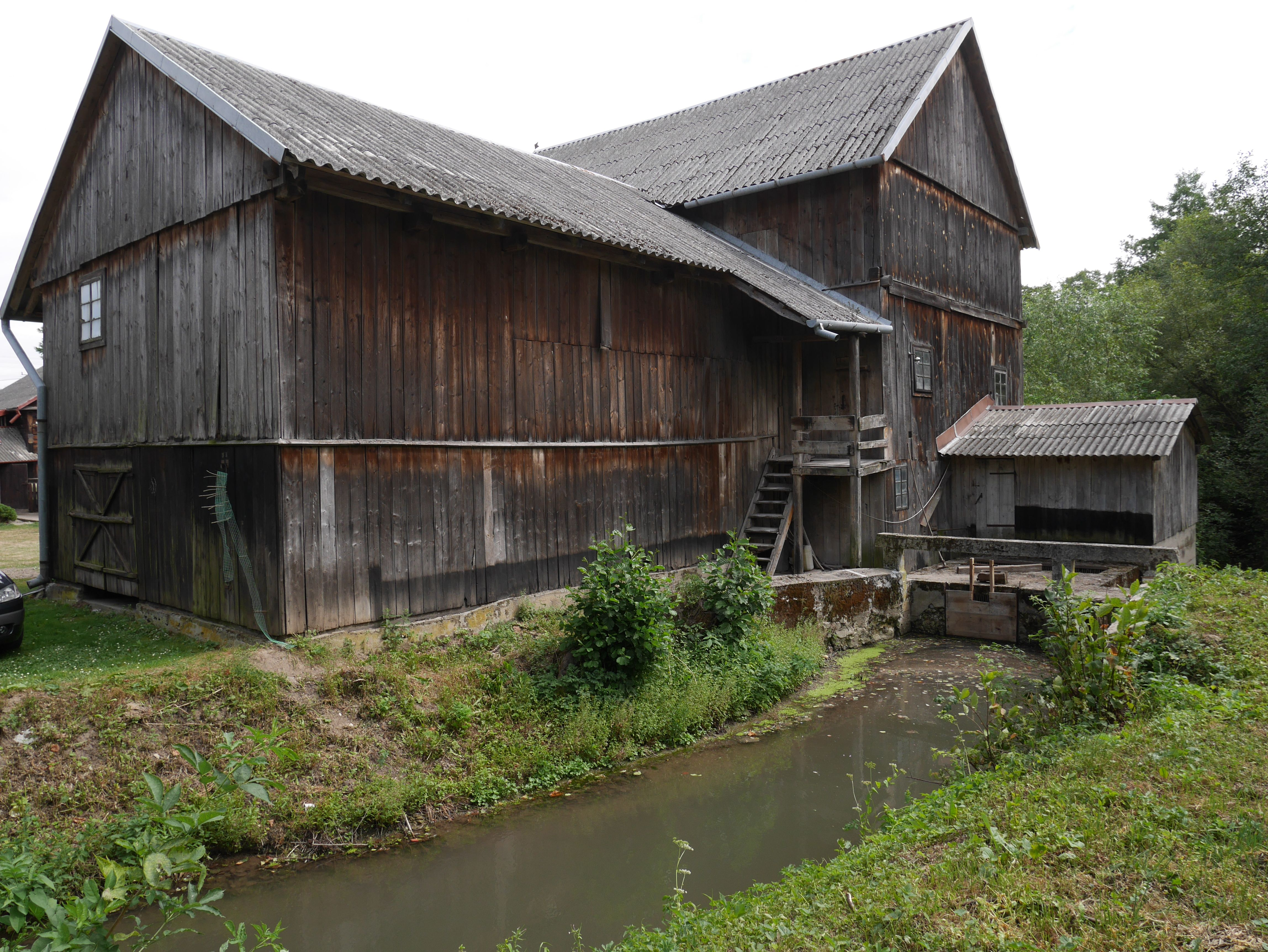
- Watermill

- Location within Poland
- Coordinates: 50°44′N 21°7′E
- Country: Poland
- Voivodeship: Świętokrzyskie
- County: Kielce
- Gmina: Łagów

Ruda [ˈruda] is a village in the administrative district of Gmina Łagów, within Kielce County, Świętokrzyskie Voivodeship, in south-central Poland. It lies approximately 6 km (4 mi) south-east of Łagów and 39 km (24 mi) south-east of the regional capital Kielce.
