= Duraczów, Kielce County =

Duraczów
- Village
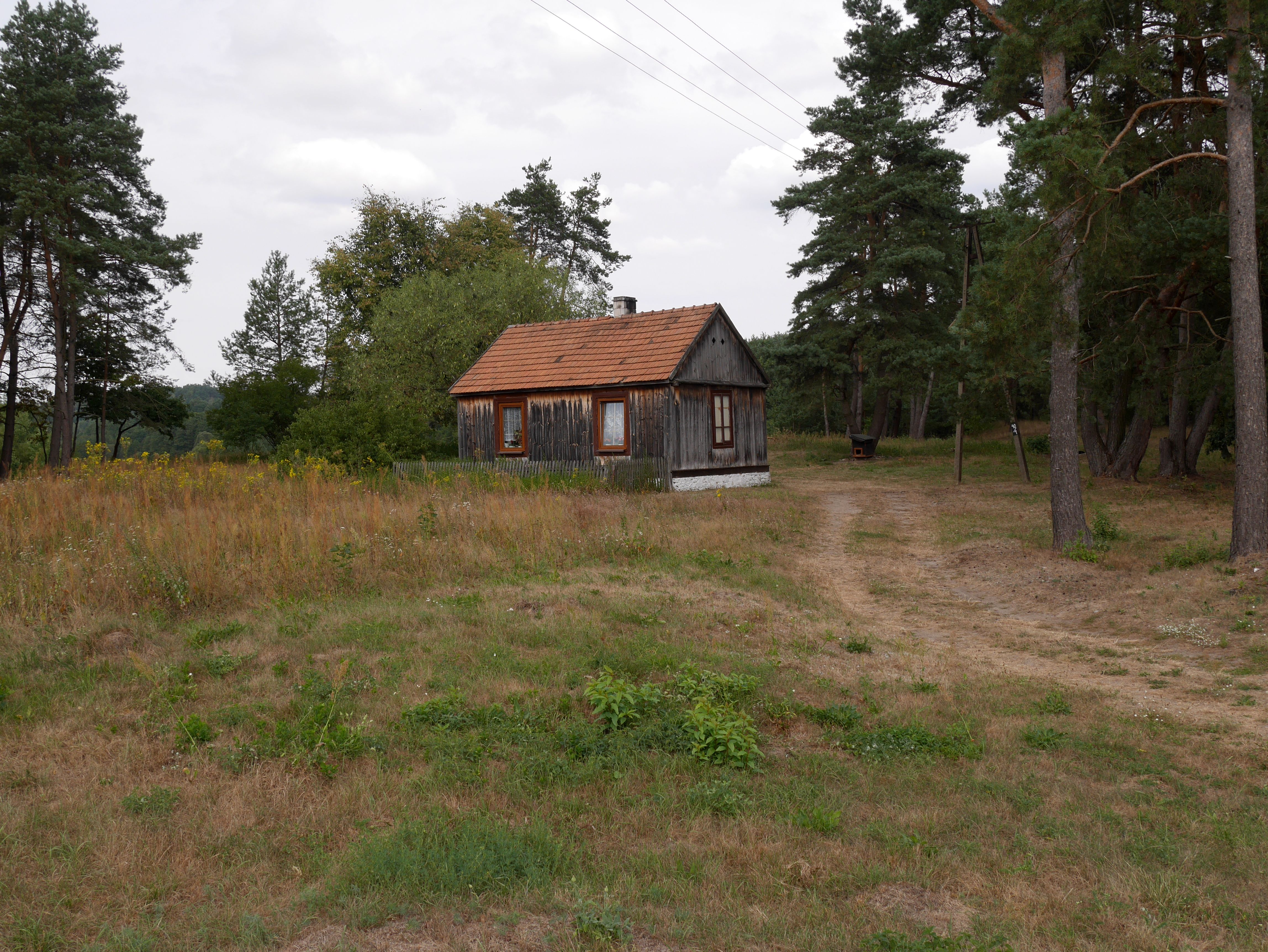

- Location within Poland
- Coordinates: 50°44′50″N 21°7′56″E
- Country: Poland
- Voivodeship: Świętokrzyskie
- County: Kielce
- Gmina: Łagów
- Population: 99

Duraczów [duˈrat͡ʂuf] is a village in the administrative district of Gmina Łagów, within Kielce County, Świętokrzyskie Voivodeship, in south-central Poland. It lies approximately 5 km (3 mi) south-east of Łagów and 40 km (25 mi) south-east of the regional capital Kielce.
