= Nowy Staw (disambiguation) =

Nowy Staw is a town in Pomeranian Voivodeship in northern Poland.

Nowy Staw (meaning "New Pond") may also refer to:

- Nowy Staw, Lublin Voivodeship, a village in Lublin Voivodeship (east Poland)
- Nowy Staw, Świętokrzyskie Voivodeship, a village in Świętokrzyskie Voivodeship (south-central Poland)

== See also ==
- Gmina Nowy Staw
