= Dębniak =

Dębniak may refer to:

== Places ==
- Dębniak, Gmina Lubochnia in Tomaszów County, Łódź Voivodeship
- Dębniak, Gmina Ujazd in Tomaszów County, Łódź Voivodeship
- Dębniak, Zgierz County, Łódź Voivodeship
- Dębniak, Kraśnik County, Lublin Voivodeship
- Dębniak, Gmina Józefów nad Wisłą in Opole County, Lublin Voivodeship
- Dębniak, Masovian Voivodeship
- Dębniak, Podlaskie Voivodeship
- Dębniak, Świętokrzyskie Voivodeship

== Other uses ==
- Dębniak, a type of Polish mead; see Mead in Poland
