= Łowicz (disambiguation) =

Łowicz is a town in Łowicz County, central Poland.

Łowicz may also refer to:

- Łowicz County, unit of territorial administration in Łódź Voivodeship
- Gmina Łowicz, administrative district in Łowicz County
- Łowicz (meteorite), fell in 1935 south of the town
