= Lechówek =

- Village
- Location within Poland
- Coordinates: 50°47′40″N 21°1′34″E
- Country: Poland
- Voivodeship: Świętokrzyskie
- County: Kielce
- Gmina: Łagów
- Population: 389

Lechówek [lɛˈxuvɛk] is a village in the administrative district of Gmina Łagów, within Kielce County, Świętokrzyskie Voivodeship, in south-central Poland. It lies approximately 5 km (3 mi) north-west of Łagów and 31 km (19 mi) east of the regional capital Kielce.
