= Winna, Świętokrzyskie Voivodeship =

Winna
- Village
- Location within Poland
- Coordinates: 50°46′7″N 21°7′51″E
- Country: Poland
- Voivodeship: Świętokrzyskie
- County: Kielce
- Gmina: Łagów
- Population: 52

Winna [ˈvinna] is a village in the administrative district of Gmina Łagów, within Kielce County, Świętokrzyskie Voivodeship, in south-central Poland. It lies approximately 4 km (2 mi) east of Łagów and 39 km (24 mi) east of the regional capital Kielce.
