= Rudki, Kielce County =

Rudki
- Village
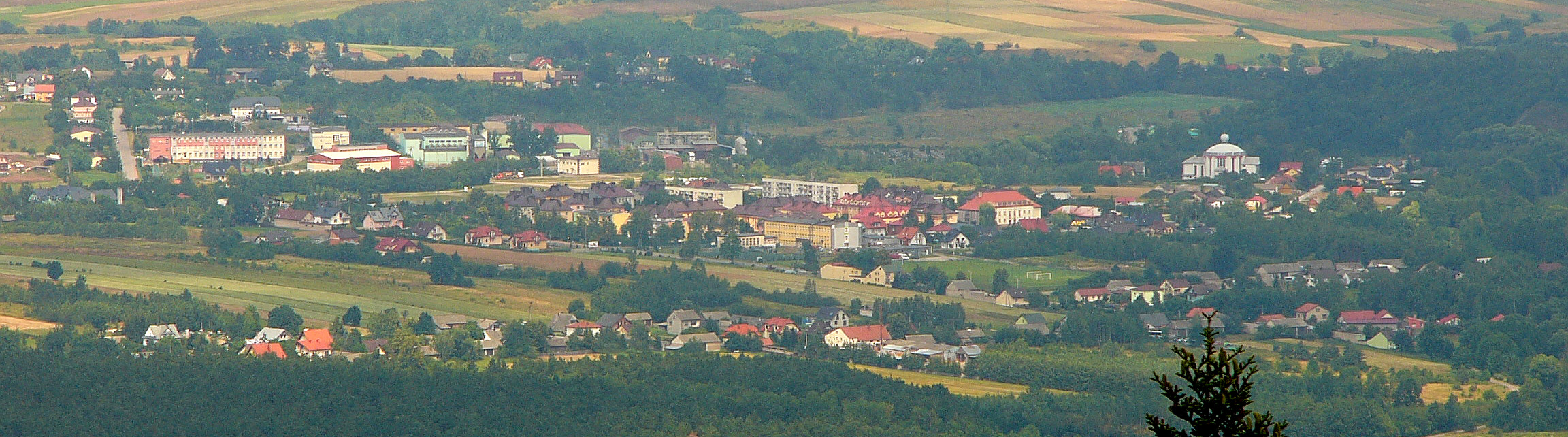

- Location within Poland
- Coordinates: 50°53′46″N 21°5′22″E
- Country: Poland
- Voivodeship: Świętokrzyskie
- County: Kielce
- Gmina: Nowa Słupia
- Population: 1,800

Rudki [ˈrutki] is a village in the administrative district of Gmina Nowa Słupia, within Kielce County, Świętokrzyskie Voivodeship, in south-central Poland. It lies approximately 4 km (2 mi) north of Nowa Słupia and 34 km (21 mi) east of the regional capital Kielce.
