= Melonek =

- Village
- Location within Poland
- Coordinates: 50°44′22″N 21°8′31″E
- Country: Poland
- Voivodeship: Świętokrzyskie
- County: Kielce
- Gmina: Łagów
- Population: 210

Melonek [mɛˈlɔnɛk] is a village in the administrative district of Gmina Łagów, within Kielce County, Świętokrzyskie Voivodeship, in south-central Poland. It lies approximately 6 km (4 mi) south-east of Łagów and 41 km (25 mi) south-east of the regional capital Kielce.
