= Piotrów, Kielce County =

Piotrów
- Village
- Location within Poland
- Coordinates: 50°47′52″N 21°9′19″E
- Country: Poland
- Voivodeship: Świętokrzyskie
- County: Kielce
- Gmina: Łagów
- Population: 904

Piotrów [ˈpjɔtruf] is a village in the administrative district of Gmina Łagów, within Kielce County, Świętokrzyskie Voivodeship, in south-central Poland. It lies approximately 6 km (4 mi) north-east of Łagów and 40 km (25 mi) east of the regional capital Kielce.
