= Złota Woda, Świętokrzyskie Voivodeship =

Złota Woda
- Village
- Location within Poland
- Coordinates: 50°46′47″N 21°2′38″E
- Country: Poland
- Voivodeship: Świętokrzyskie
- County: Kielce
- Gmina: Łagów
- Population: 264

Złota Woda [ˈzwɔta ˈvɔda] is a village in the administrative district of Gmina Łagów, within Kielce County, Świętokrzyskie Voivodeship, in south-central Poland. It lies approximately 3 km (2 mi) west of Łagów and 33 km (21 mi) east of the regional capital Kielce.
