= Baszowice =

- Village
- Location within Poland
- Coordinates: 50°52′31″N 21°4′8″E
- Country: Poland
- Voivodeship: Świętokrzyskie
- County: Kielce
- Gmina: Nowa Słupia
- Population: 400

Baszowice [baʂɔˈvit͡sɛ] is a village in the administrative district of Gmina Nowa Słupia, within Kielce County, Świętokrzyskie Voivodeship, in south-central Poland. It lies approximately 2 km (1 mi) north-west of Nowa Słupia and 32 km (20 mi) east of the regional capital Kielce.
