= Jeleniów =

Jeleniów may refer to the following places in Poland:

- Jeleniów, Lower Silesian Voivodeship (south-west Poland)
- Jeleniów, Świętokrzyskie Voivodeship (south-central Poland)
- Jeleniów, Lubusz Voivodeship (west Poland)
