= Gęsice =

Gęsice may refer to the following places in Poland:

- Gęsice, Lower Silesian Voivodeship (south-west Poland)
- Gęsice, Świętokrzyskie Voivodeship (south-central Poland)
