= Stara Zbelutka =

- Village
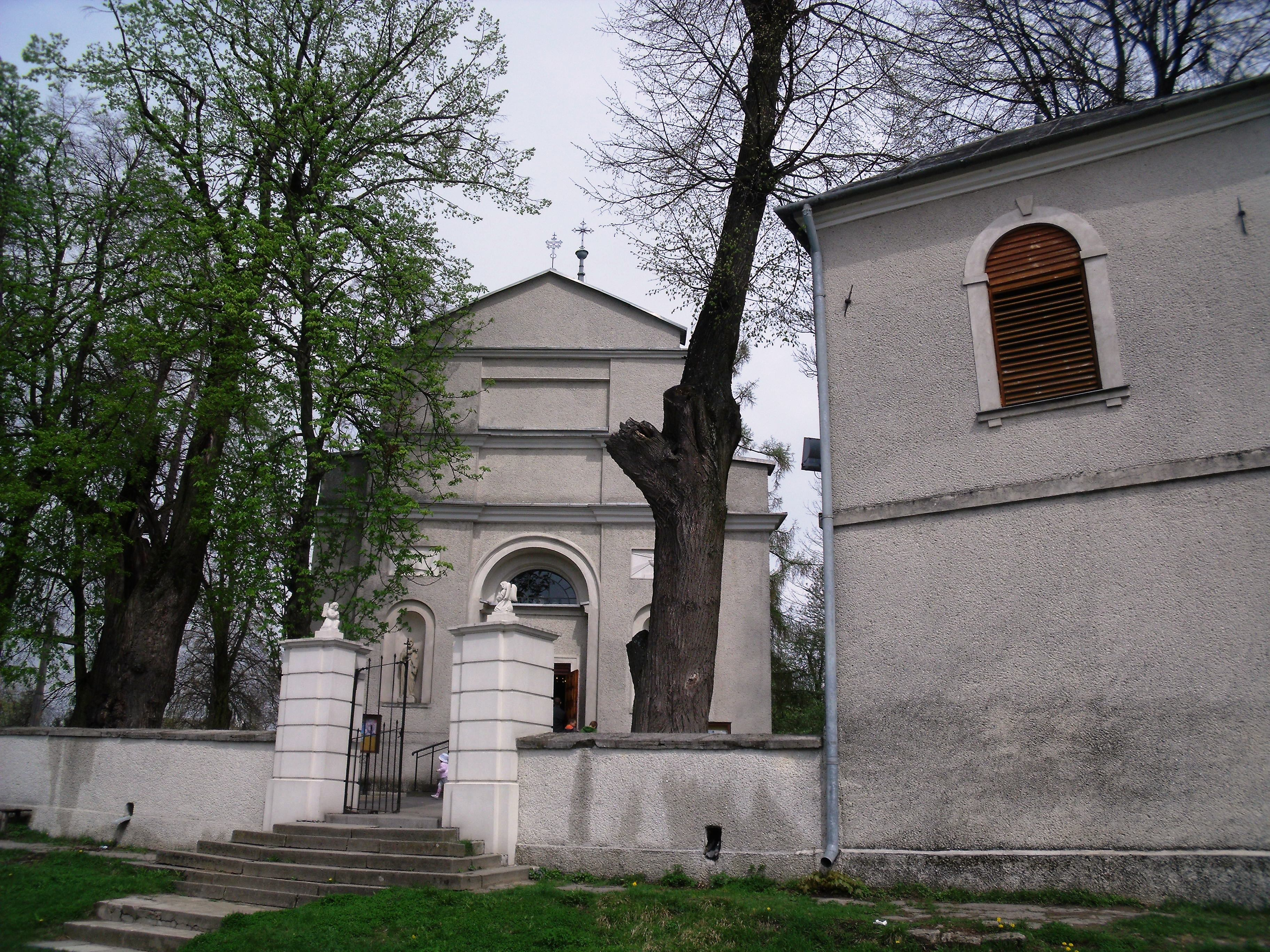

- Location within Poland
- Coordinates: 50°43′43″N 21°6′52″E
- Country: Poland
- Voivodeship: Świętokrzyskie
- County: Kielce
- Gmina: Łagów
- Population: 487

Stara Zbelutka [ˈstara zbɛˈlutka] is a village in the administrative district of Gmina Łagów, within Kielce County, Świętokrzyskie Voivodeship, in south-central Poland. It lies approximately 6 km (4 mi) south of Łagów and 39 km (24 mi) south-east of the regional capital Kielce.
