= Wola Łagowska =

- Village
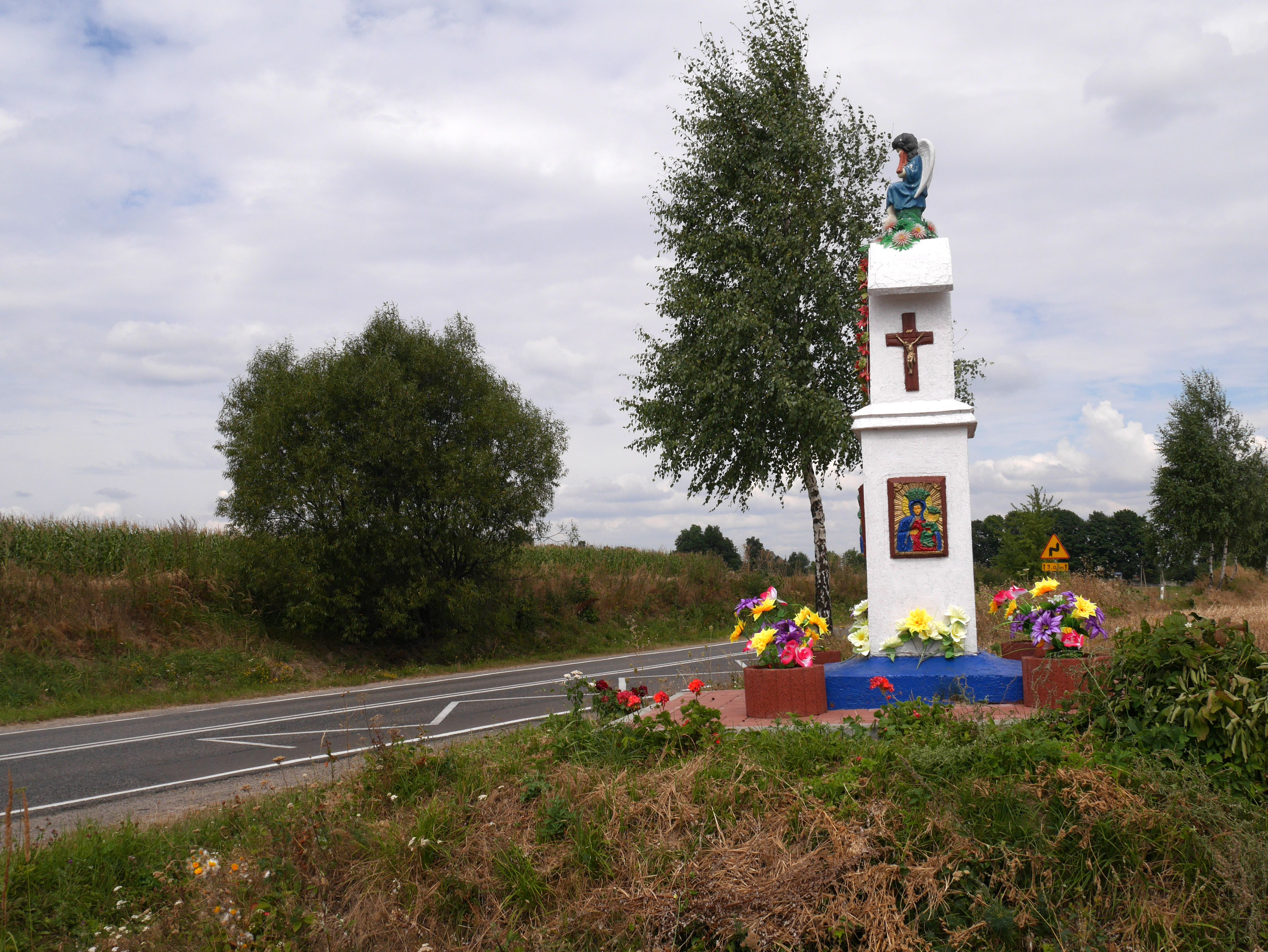
- Wayside shrine

- Location within Poland
- Coordinates: 50°45′9″N 21°4′34″E
- Country: Poland
- Voivodeship: Świętokrzyskie
- County: Kielce
- Gmina: Łagów
- Population: 136

Wola Łagowska [ˈvɔla waˈɡɔfska] is a village in the administrative district of Gmina Łagów, within Kielce County, Świętokrzyskie Voivodeship, in south-central Poland. It lies approximately 3 km (2 mi) south of Łagów and 36 km (22 mi) south-east of the regional capital Kielce.
