= Skały, Świętokrzyskie Voivodeship =

Skały
- Village
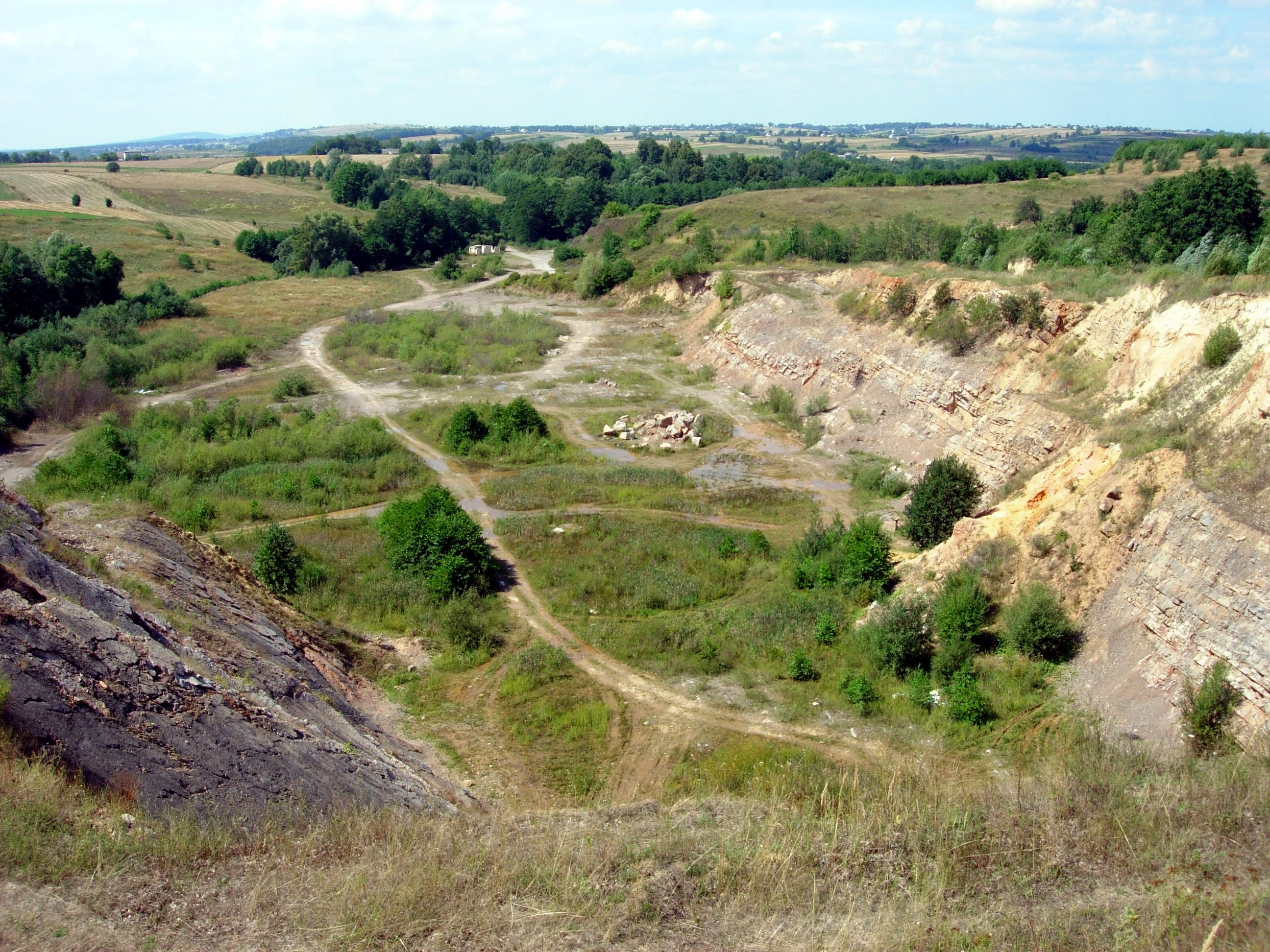

- Location within Poland
- Coordinates: 50°54′11″N 21°9′24″E
- Country: Poland
- Voivodeship: Świętokrzyskie
- County: Kielce
- Gmina: Nowa Słupia
- Population: 190

Skały [ˈskawɨ] is a village in the administrative district of Gmina Nowa Słupia, within Kielce County, Świętokrzyskie Voivodeship, in south-central Poland. It lies approximately 7 km (4 mi) north-east of Nowa Słupia and 38 km (24 mi) east of the regional capital Kielce.

Middle Devonian rocks cropping out in the Dobruchna valley near Skały are the type locality of a lithostratigraphic unit called the Skały Formation (formerly Skały Beds). The Skały Formation is renowned for the richness of its fossil fauna, especially brachiopods. Some species found near Skały are named after the village, like the coral Blothrophyllum skalense Gürich, 1896 or the trilobite Nyterops skalensis (Kielan, 1956).
