= Czyżów =

Czyżów may refer to the following places:

- Czyżów, Tarnów County in Lesser Poland Voivodeship (south Poland)
- Czyżów, Wieliczka County in Lesser Poland Voivodeship (south Poland)
- Czyżów, Łódź Voivodeship (central Poland)
- Czyżów, Busko County in Świętokrzyskie Voivodeship (south-central Poland)
- Czyżów, Kielce County in Świętokrzyskie Voivodeship (south-central Poland)
