= Sędek, Świętokrzyskie Voivodeship =

Sędek
- Village
- Location within Poland
- Coordinates: 50°46′0″N 21°0′45″E
- Country: Poland
- Voivodeship: Świętokrzyskie
- County: Kielce
- Gmina: Łagów
- Population: 332

Sędek [ˈsɛndɛk] is a village in the administrative district of Gmina Łagów, within Kielce County, Świętokrzyskie Voivodeship, in south-central Poland. It lies approximately 6 km (4 mi) west of Łagów and 31 km (19 mi) south-east of the regional capital Kielce.
