= Sadków, Świętokrzyskie Voivodeship =

Sadków
- Village
- Location within Poland
- Coordinates: 50°44′16″N 21°4′23″E
- Country: Poland
- Voivodeship: Świętokrzyskie
- County: Kielce
- Gmina: Łagów
- Population: 468

Sadków [ˈsatkuf] is a village in the administrative district of Gmina Łagów, within Kielce County, Świętokrzyskie Voivodeship, in south-central Poland. It lies approximately 5 km (3 mi) south of Łagów and 36 km (22 mi) south-east of the regional capital Kielce.
