= Hucisko, Gmina Nowa Słupia =

Hucisko
- Village
- Location within Poland
- Coordinates: 50°52′28″N 21°2′44″E
- Country: Poland
- Voivodeship: Świętokrzyskie
- County: Kielce
- Gmina: Nowa Słupia
- Population: 90

Hucisko [xuˈt͡ɕiskɔ] is a village in the administrative district of Gmina Nowa Słupia, within Kielce County, Świętokrzyskie Voivodeship, in south-central Poland. It lies approximately 4 km (2 mi) north-west of Nowa Słupia and 31 km (19 mi) east of the regional capital Kielce.
