= Łyszkowice-Kolonia =

- Village
- Location within Poland
- Coordinates: 51°58′8″N 19°55′14″E
- Country: Poland
- Voivodeship: Łódź
- County: Łowicz
- Gmina: Łyszkowice
- Population: 190

Łyszkowice-Kolonia [wɨʂkɔˈvit͡sɛ kɔˈlɔɲa] is a village in the administrative district of Gmina Łyszkowice, within Łowicz County, Łódź Voivodeship, in the central Poland.
