= Uchań Górny =

- Village
- Location within Poland
- Coordinates: 51°56′36″N 19°51′35″E
- Country: Poland
- Voivodeship: Łódź
- County: Łowicz
- Gmina: Łyszkowice
- Population: 160

Uchań Górny [ˈuxaɲ ˈɡurnɨ] ("Upper Uchań") is a village in the administrative district of Gmina Łyszkowice, within Łowicz County, Łódź Voivodeship, in central Poland.
