= Gęsice, Świętokrzyskie Voivodeship =

Gęsice
- Village
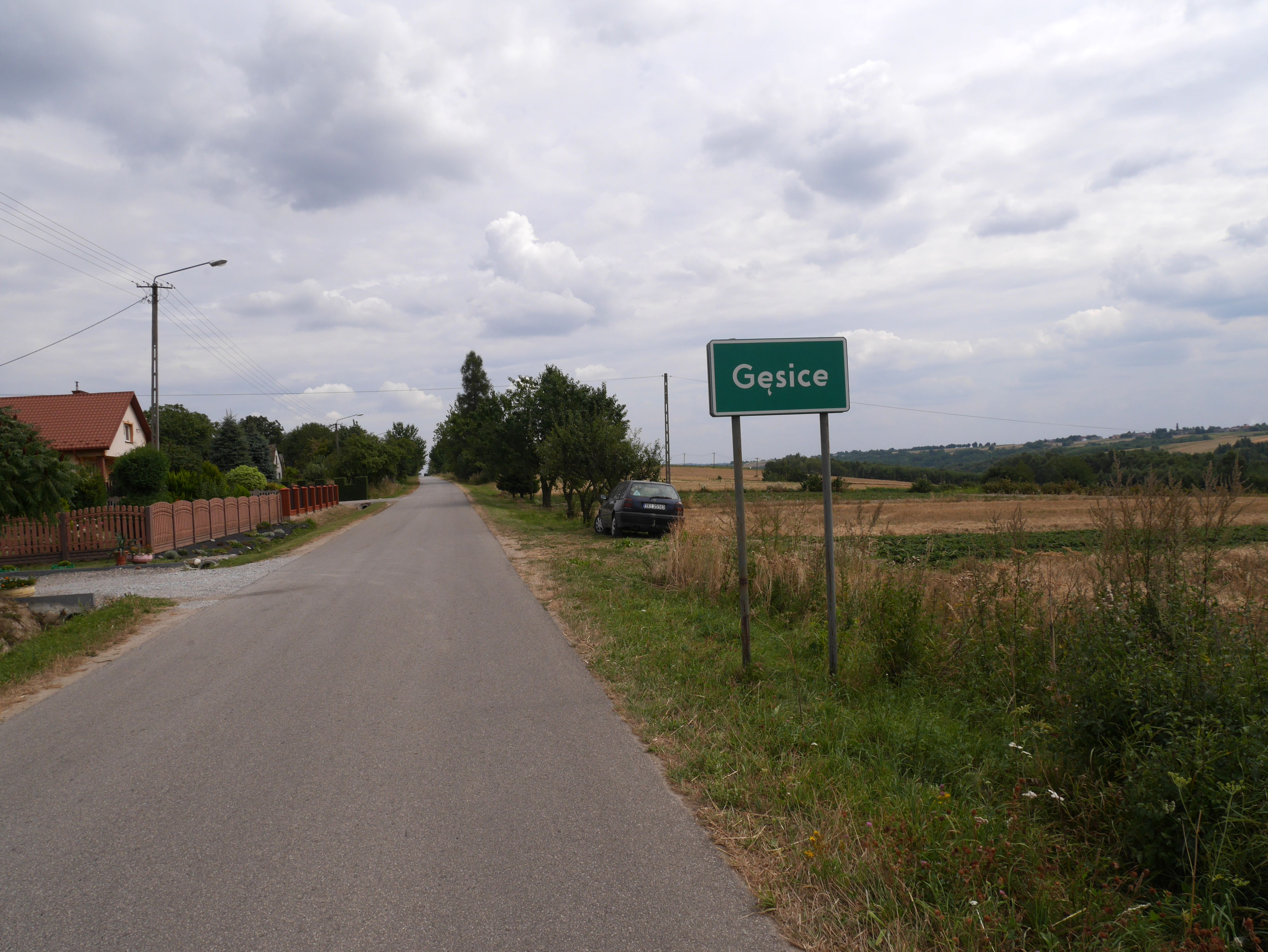

- Location within Poland
- Coordinates: 50°44′32″N 21°6′28″E
- Country: Poland
- Voivodeship: Świętokrzyskie
- County: Kielce
- Gmina: Łagów
- Population: 240

Gęsice [ɡɛ̃ˈɕit͡sɛ] is a village in the administrative district of Gmina Łagów, within Kielce County, Świętokrzyskie Voivodeship, in south-central Poland. It lies approximately 5 km (3 mi) south-east of Łagów and 38 km (24 mi) south-east of the regional capital Kielce.
