= Włochy, Kielce County =

Włochy
- Village
- Location within Poland
- Coordinates: 50°54′31″N 21°8′44″E
- Country: Poland
- Voivodeship: Świętokrzyskie
- County: Kielce
- Gmina: Nowa Słupia
- Population: 290

Włochy [ˈvwɔxɨ] is a village in the administrative district of Gmina Nowa Słupia, within Kielce County, Świętokrzyskie Voivodeship, in south-central Poland. It lies approximately 7 km (4 mi) north-east of Nowa Słupia and 38 km (24 mi) east of the regional capital Kielce.
