= Bartoszowiny =

- Village
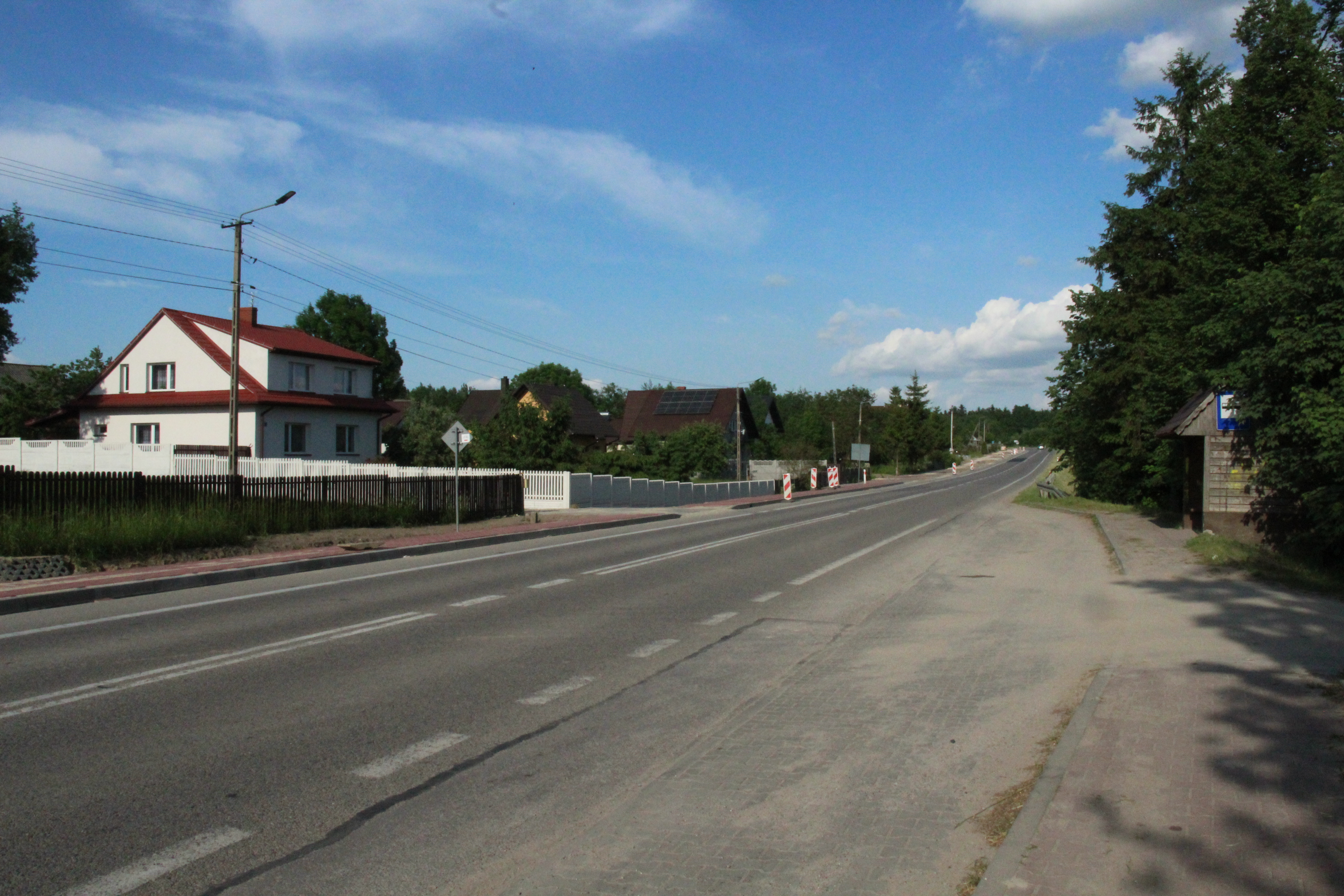

- Location within Poland
- Coordinates: 50°50′5″N 21°1′54″E
- Country: Poland
- Voivodeship: Świętokrzyskie
- County: Kielce
- Gmina: Nowa Słupia
- Population: 270

Bartoszowiny [bartɔʂɔˈvinɨ] is a village in the administrative district of Gmina Nowa Słupia, within Kielce County, Świętokrzyskie Voivodeship, in south-central Poland. It lies approximately 5 km (3 mi) south-west of Nowa Słupia and 30 km (19 mi) east of the regional capital Kielce.
