= Stara Słupia =

- Village
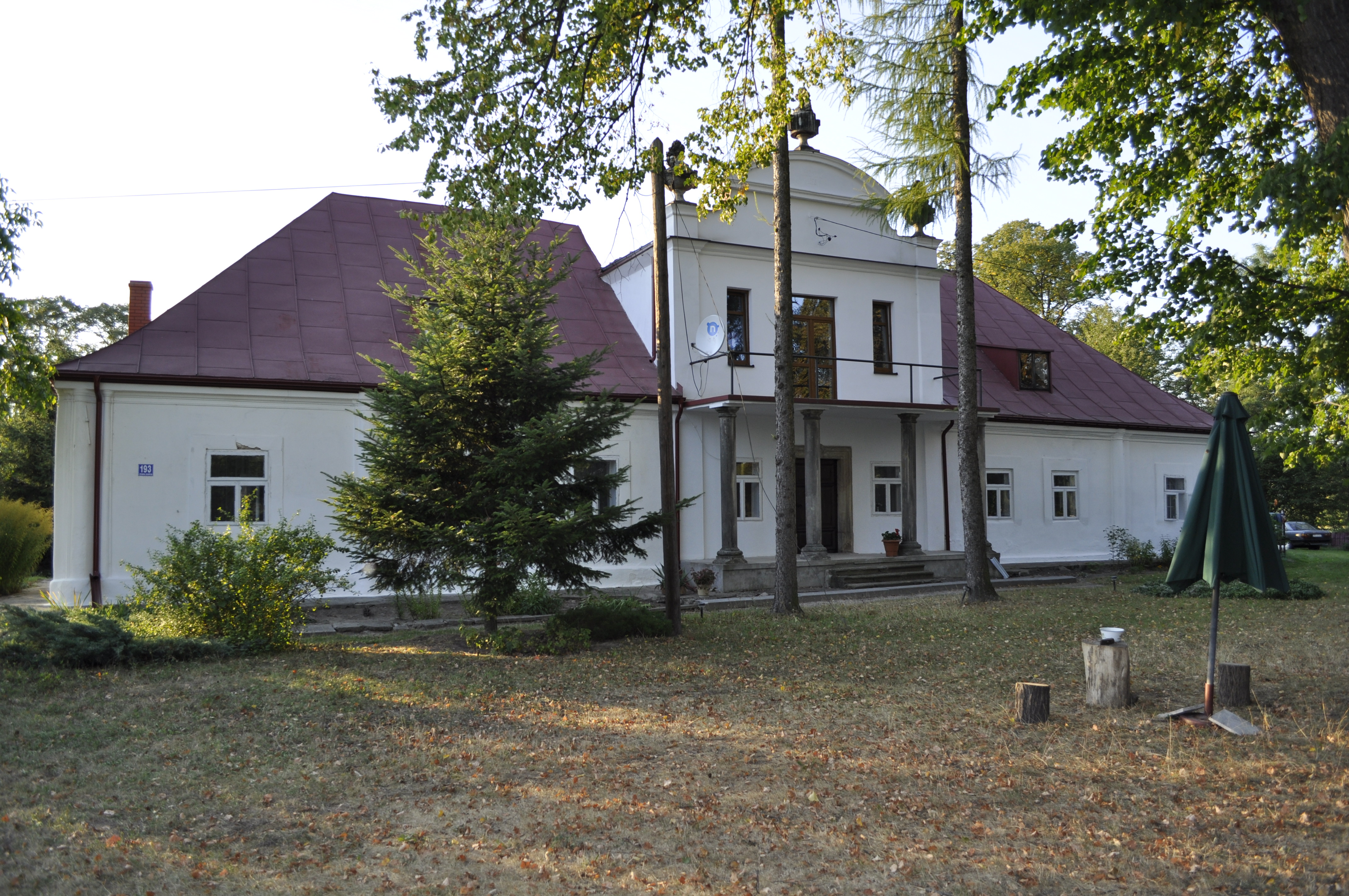
- Manor

- Location within Poland
- Coordinates: 50°51′34″N 21°6′28″E
- Country: Poland
- Voivodeship: Świętokrzyskie
- County: Kielce
- Gmina: Nowa Słupia
- Population: 1,000

Stara Słupia [ˈstara ˈswupja] is a village in the administrative district of Gmina Nowa Słupia, within Kielce County, Świętokrzyskie Voivodeship, in south-central Poland. It lies approximately 2 km (1 mi) east of Nowa Słupia and 35 km (22 mi) east of the regional capital Kielce.
