= Łowicz (meteorite) =

Meteorite found in Poland

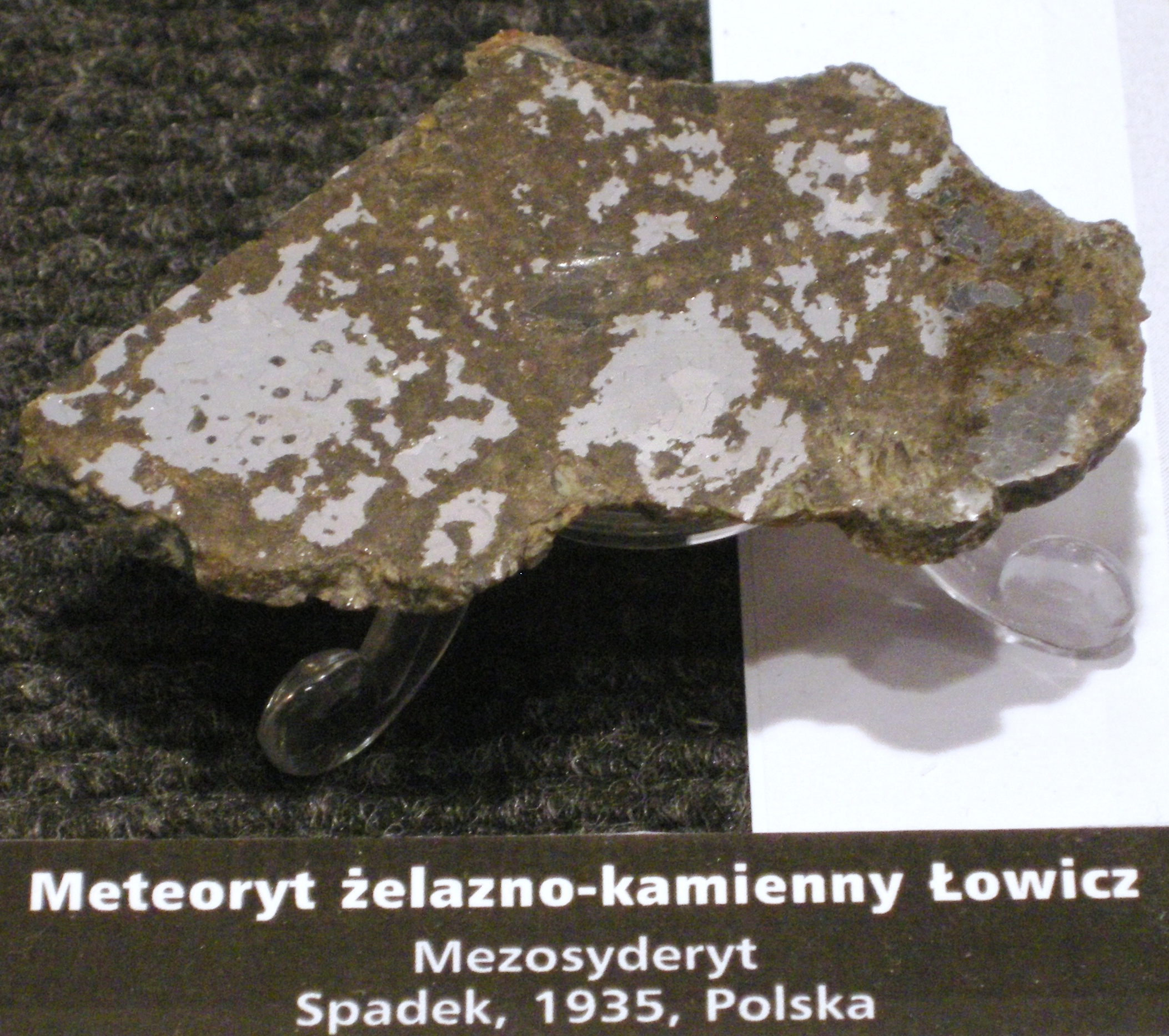
- Group: Mesosiderite
- Country: Poland
- Region: Łódzkie
- Coordinates: 52°00′N 19°55′E
- Observed fall: Yes
- Fall date: March 12, 1935
- TKW: 59 kg
- Strewn field: Yes

Łowicz is a stony-iron meteorite (mesosiderite) which fell on 12 March 1935 at 0:50 in the area of Krępa Rzeczyce and Wrzeczko villages, south of Łowicz. Numerous specimens were recovered.

== See also ==
- Glossary of meteoritics
- Meteorite fall
