= Gmina Nowa Słupia =

Gmina Nowa Słupia Nowa Słupia Commune
- Gmina
- Coat of arms
- Interactive map of Gmina Nowa Słupia
- Coordinates (Nowa Słupia): 50°51′45″N 21°5′13″E
- Country: Poland
- Voivodeship: Świętokrzyskie
- County: Kielce County
- Seat: Nowa Słupia

Area
  - Total: 85.94 km^{2} (33.18 sq mi)

Population (2006)
  - Total: 9,691
  - Density: 112.8/km^{2} (292.1/sq mi)
- Website: http://www.nowaslupia.pl

Gmina Nowa Słupia is a rural gmina (administrative district) in Kielce County, Świętokrzyskie Voivodeship, in south-central Poland. Its seat is the village of Nowa Słupia, which lies approximately 34 kilometres (21 mi) east of the regional capital Kielce.

The gmina covers an area of 85.94 square kilometres (33.2 sq mi) and, as of 31 December 2016, its total population is 9,559.

The gmina contains part of the protected area called Jeleniowska Landscape Park.

== Villages ==
Gmina Nowa Słupia contains the villages and settlements of Bartoszowiny, Baszowice, Cząstków, Dębniak, Dębno, Hucisko, Jeleniów, Jeziorko, Mirocice, Nowa Słupia, Paprocice, Pokrzywianka, Rudki, Serwis, Skały, Sosnówka, Stara Słupia, Trzcianka, Włochy and Wólka Milanowska.

== Neighbouring gminas ==
Gmina Nowa Słupia is bordered by the gminas of Bieliny, Bodzentyn, Łagów, Pawłów and Waśniów.
