= Nowy Staw, Świętokrzyskie Voivodeship =

Nowy Staw
- Village
- Location within Poland
- Coordinates: 50°46′1″N 21°6′56″E
- Country: Poland
- Voivodeship: Świętokrzyskie
- County: Kielce
- Gmina: Łagów
- Population: 187

Nowy Staw [ˈnɔvɨ ˈstaf] is a village in the administrative district of Gmina Łagów, within Kielce County, Świętokrzyskie Voivodeship, in south-central Poland. It lies approximately 3 km (2 mi) south-east of Łagów and 38 km (24 mi) east of the regional capital Kielce.
