= Mirocice =

- Village
- Location within Poland
- Coordinates: 50°53′3″N 21°2′40″E
- Country: Poland
- Voivodeship: Świętokrzyskie
- County: Kielce
- Gmina: Nowa Słupia
- Population: 570

Mirocice [mirɔˈt͡ɕit͡sɛ] is a village in the administrative district of Gmina Nowa Słupia, within Kielce County, Świętokrzyskie Voivodeship, in south-central Poland. It lies approximately 4 km (2 mi) north-west of Nowa Słupia and 31 km (19 mi) east of the regional capital Kielce.
