= Paprocice =

- Village
- Location within Poland
- Coordinates: 50°49′26″N 21°4′34″E
- Country: Poland
- Voivodeship: Świętokrzyskie
- County: Kielce
- Gmina: Nowa Słupia
- Population: 201

Paprocice [paprɔˈt͡ɕit͡sɛ] is a village in the administrative district of Gmina Nowa Słupia, within Kielce County, Świętokrzyskie Voivodeship, in south-central Poland. It lies approximately 5 km (3 mi) south of Nowa Słupia and 33 km (21 mi) east of the regional capital Kielce.
