= Uchań Dolny =

- Village
- Location within Poland
- Coordinates: 52°1′45″N 19°55′54″E
- Country: Poland
- Voivodeship: Łódź
- County: Łowicz
- Gmina: Łyszkowice
- Population: 120

Uchań Dolny [ˈuxaɲ ˈdɔlnɨ] ("Lower Uchań") is a village in the administrative district of Gmina Łyszkowice, within Łowicz County, Łódź Voivodeship, in central Poland.
