= Nowe Grudze =

- Village
- Location within Poland
- Coordinates: 52°02′05″N 19°53′00″E
- Country: Poland
- Voivodeship: Łódź
- County: Łowicz
- Gmina: Łyszkowice
- Population (2011): 165

Gender Distribution
  - Male: 77 (46.7%)
  - Female: 88 (53.3%)

Nowe Grudze [ˈnɔvɛ ˈɡrud͡zɛ] is a village in the administrative district of Gmina Łyszkowice, within Łowicz County, Łódź Voivodeship, in central Poland.
