= Dębno, Gmina Nowa Słupia =

Dębno
- Village
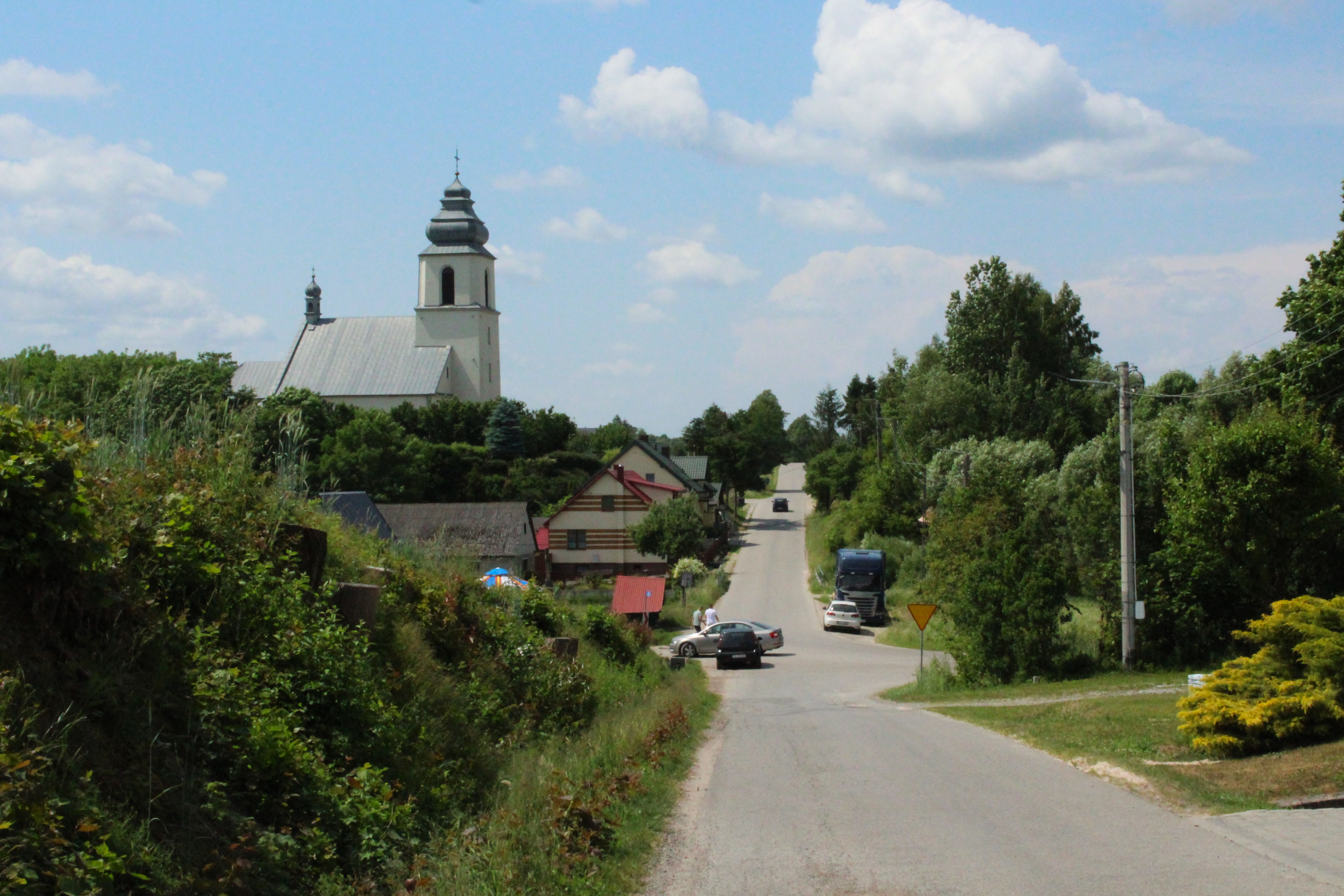

- Location within Poland
- Coordinates: 50°53′24″N 20°59′14″E
- Country: Poland
- Voivodeship: Świętokrzyskie
- County: Kielce
- Gmina: Nowa Słupia
- Population: 540

Dębno [ˈdɛmbnɔ] is a village in the administrative district of Gmina Nowa Słupia, within Kielce County, Świętokrzyskie Voivodeship, in south-central Poland. It lies approximately 8 km (5 mi) north-west of Nowa Słupia and 27 km (17 mi) east of the regional capital Kielce.
