= Milanowska Wólka =

- Village
- Location within Poland
- Coordinates: 50°51′7″N 21°5′7″E
- Country: Poland
- Voivodeship: Świętokrzyskie
- County: Kielce
- Gmina: Nowa Słupia

Milanowska Wólka [milaˈnɔfska ˈvulka] is a village in the administrative district of Gmina Nowa Słupia, within Kielce County, Świętokrzyskie Voivodeship, in south-central Poland. It lies approximately 2 km (1 mi) south of Nowa Słupia and 34 km (21 mi) east of the regional capital Kielce.
