= Seroki, Łódź Voivodeship =

Seroki
- Village
- Location within Poland
- Coordinates: 52°2′N 19°58′E
- Country: Poland
- Voivodeship: Łódź
- County: Łowicz
- Gmina: Łyszkowice

Seroki [sɛˈrɔki] is a village in the administrative district of Gmina Łyszkowice, within Łowicz County, Łódź Voivodeship, in central Poland.
