= Płucki =

- Village
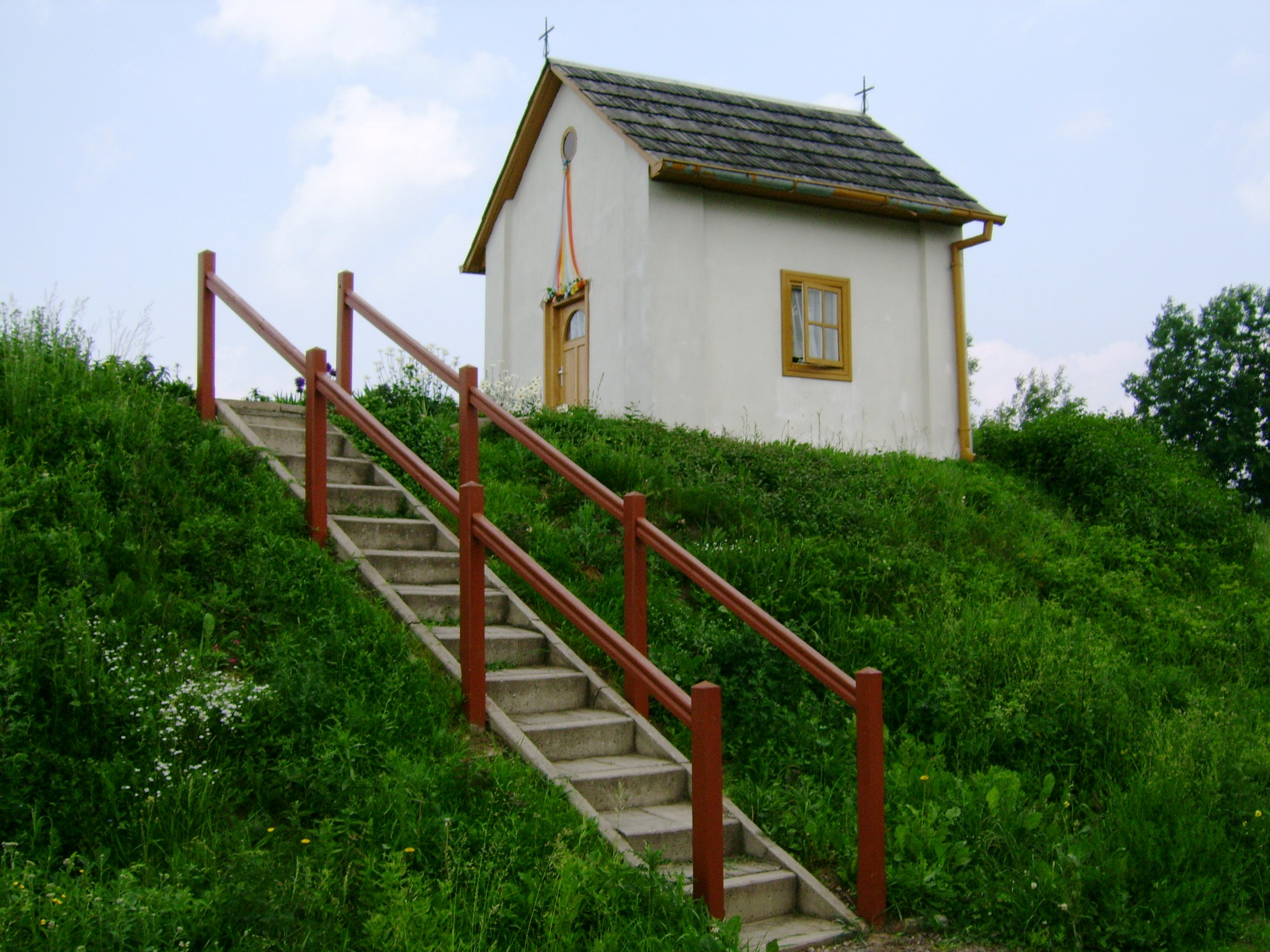

- Location within Poland
- Coordinates: 50°47′30″N 21°4′16″E
- Country: Poland
- Voivodeship: Świętokrzyskie
- County: Kielce
- Gmina: Łagów
- Population: 296

Płucki [ˈpwut͡ski] is a village in the administrative district of Gmina Łagów, within Kielce County, Świętokrzyskie Voivodeship, in south-central Poland. It lies approximately 2 km (1 mi) north-west of Łagów and 34 km (21 mi) east of the regional capital Kielce.
