= Stachlew =

- Village
- Location within Poland
- Coordinates: 52°0′23″N 20°1′33″E
- Country: Poland
- Voivodeship: Łódź
- County: Łowicz
- Gmina: Łyszkowice
- Population: 1,020

Stachlew [ˈstaxlɛf] is a village in Gmina Łyszkowice, Łowicz County, Łódź Voivodeship, Poland.
