= Bobiecko =

- Village
- Location within Poland
- Coordinates: 52°1′N 19°58′E
- Country: Poland
- Voivodeship: Łódź
- County: Łowicz
- Gmina: Łyszkowice

Bobiecko [bɔˈbjɛt͡skɔ] is a village in the administrative district of Gmina Łyszkowice, within Łowicz County, Łódź Voivodeship, in central Poland.
