= Zakulin =

- Village
- Location within Poland
- Coordinates: 51°59′N 19°57′E
- Country: Poland
- Voivodeship: Łódź
- County: Łowicz
- Gmina: Łyszkowice

Zakulin [zaˈkulin] is a village in the administrative district of Gmina Łyszkowice, within Łowicz County, Łódź Voivodeship, in central Poland.
