= Sosnówka, Świętokrzyskie Voivodeship =

Sosnówka
- Village
- Location within Poland
- Coordinates: 50°54′23″N 21°5′6″E
- Country: Poland
- Voivodeship: Świętokrzyskie
- County: Kielce
- Gmina: Nowa Słupia
- Population: 660

Sosnówka [sɔsˈnufka] is a village in the administrative district of Gmina Nowa Słupia, within Kielce County, Świętokrzyskie Voivodeship, in south-central Poland. It lies approximately 5 km (3 mi) north of Nowa Słupia and 33 km (21 mi) east of the regional capital Kielce.

In 2005 the village had a population of 660.
