= Gmina Łyszkowice =

Gmina Łyszkowice Łyszkowice Commune
- Gmina
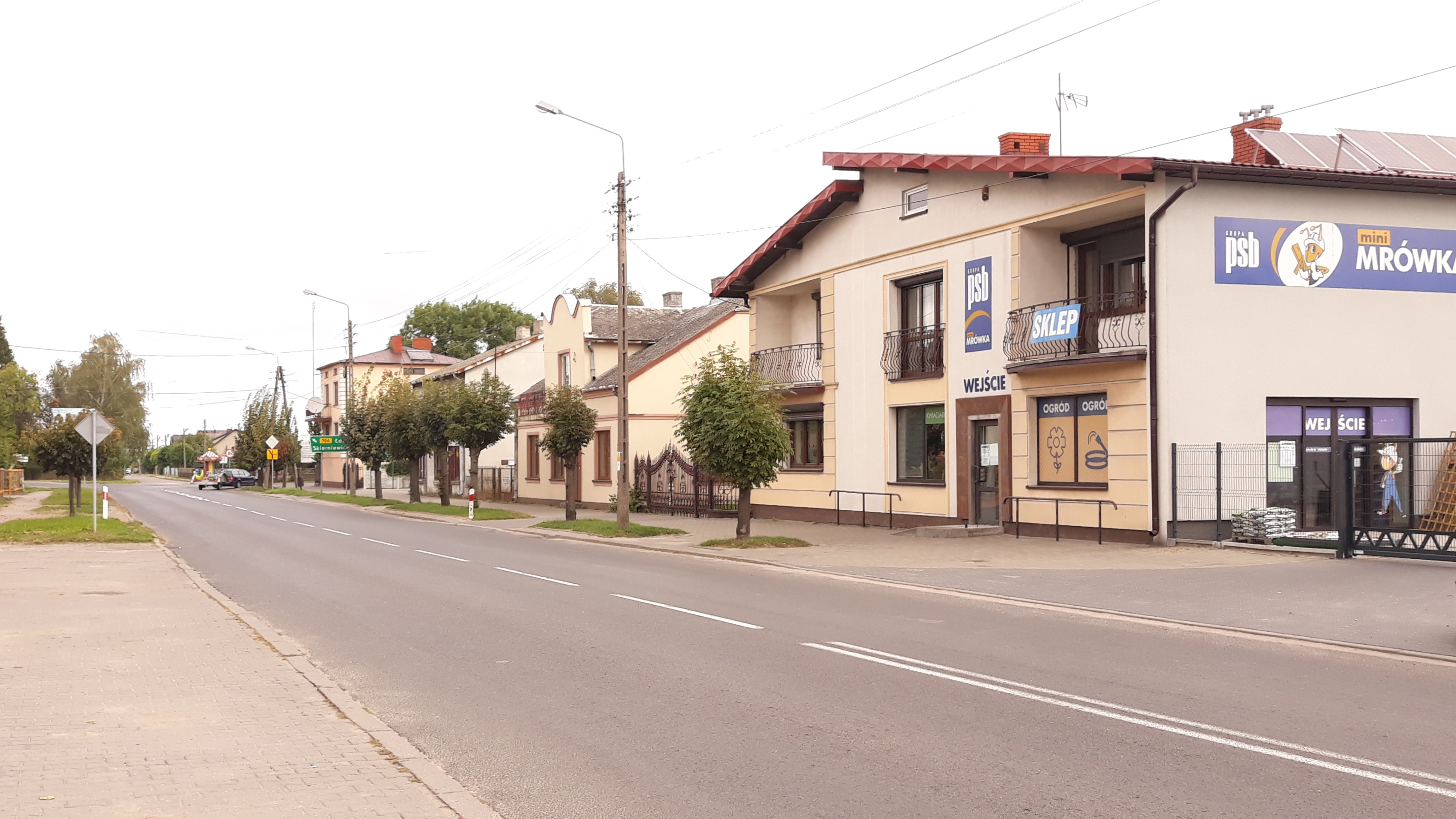

- Coat of arms
- Interactive map of Gmina Łyszkowice
- Coordinates (Łyszkowice): 51°59′N 19°55′E
- Country: Poland
- Voivodeship: Łódź
- County: Łowicz
- Seat: Łyszkowice

Area
  - Total: 106.9 km^{2} (41.3 sq mi)

Population (2006)
  - Total: 6,931
  - Density: 64.84/km^{2} (167.9/sq mi)
- Website: lyszkowice.pl

Gmina Łyszkowice is a rural gmina (administrative district) in Łowicz County, Łódź Voivodeship, in central Poland. Its seat is the village of Łyszkowice, which lies approximately 13 kilometres (8 mi) south of Łowicz and 39 km (24 mi) north-east of the regional capital Łódź.

The gmina covers an area of 106.9 square kilometres (41.3 sq mi), and as of 2006 its total population is 6,931.

== Villages ==
Gmina Łyszkowice contains the villages and settlements of:

- Bobiecko
- Bobrowa
- Czatolin
- Gzinka
- Kalenice
- Kuczków
- Łagów
- Łyszkowice
- Łyszkowice-Kolonia
- Nowe Grudze
- Polesie
- Seligów
- Seroki
- Stachlew
- Stare Grudze
- Trzcianka
- Uchań Dolny
- Uchań Górny
- Wrzeczko
- Zakulin

== Neighbouring gminas ==
Gmina Łyszkowice is bordered by the gminas of Dmosin, Domaniewice, Głowno, Lipce Reymontowskie, Łowicz, Maków, Nieborów, and Skierniewice.
