= Cząstków, Świętokrzyskie Voivodeship =

Cząstków
- Village
- Location within Poland
- Coordinates: 50°53′39″N 21°7′19″E
- Country: Poland
- Voivodeship: Świętokrzyskie
- County: Kielce
- Gmina: Nowa Słupia
- Population: 390

Cząstków [ˈt͡ʂɔ̃stkuf] is a village in the administrative district of Gmina Nowa Słupia, within Kielce County, Świętokrzyskie Voivodeship, in south-central Poland. It lies approximately 5 km (3 mi) north-east of Nowa Słupia and 36 km (22 mi) east of the regional capital Kielce.
