= Jeleniów, Świętokrzyskie Voivodeship =

Jeleniów
- Village
- Location within Poland
- Coordinates: 50°50′43″N 21°6′39″E
- Country: Poland
- Voivodeship: Świętokrzyskie
- County: Kielce
- Gmina: Nowa Słupia
- Population: 770

Jeleniów [jɛˈlɛɲuf] is a village in the administrative district of Gmina Nowa Słupia, within Kielce County, Świętokrzyskie Voivodeship, in south-central Poland. It lies approximately 3 km (2 mi) south-east of Nowa Słupia and 35 km (22 mi) east of the regional capital Kielce.
