= Trzcianka, Kielce County =

Trzcianka
- Village
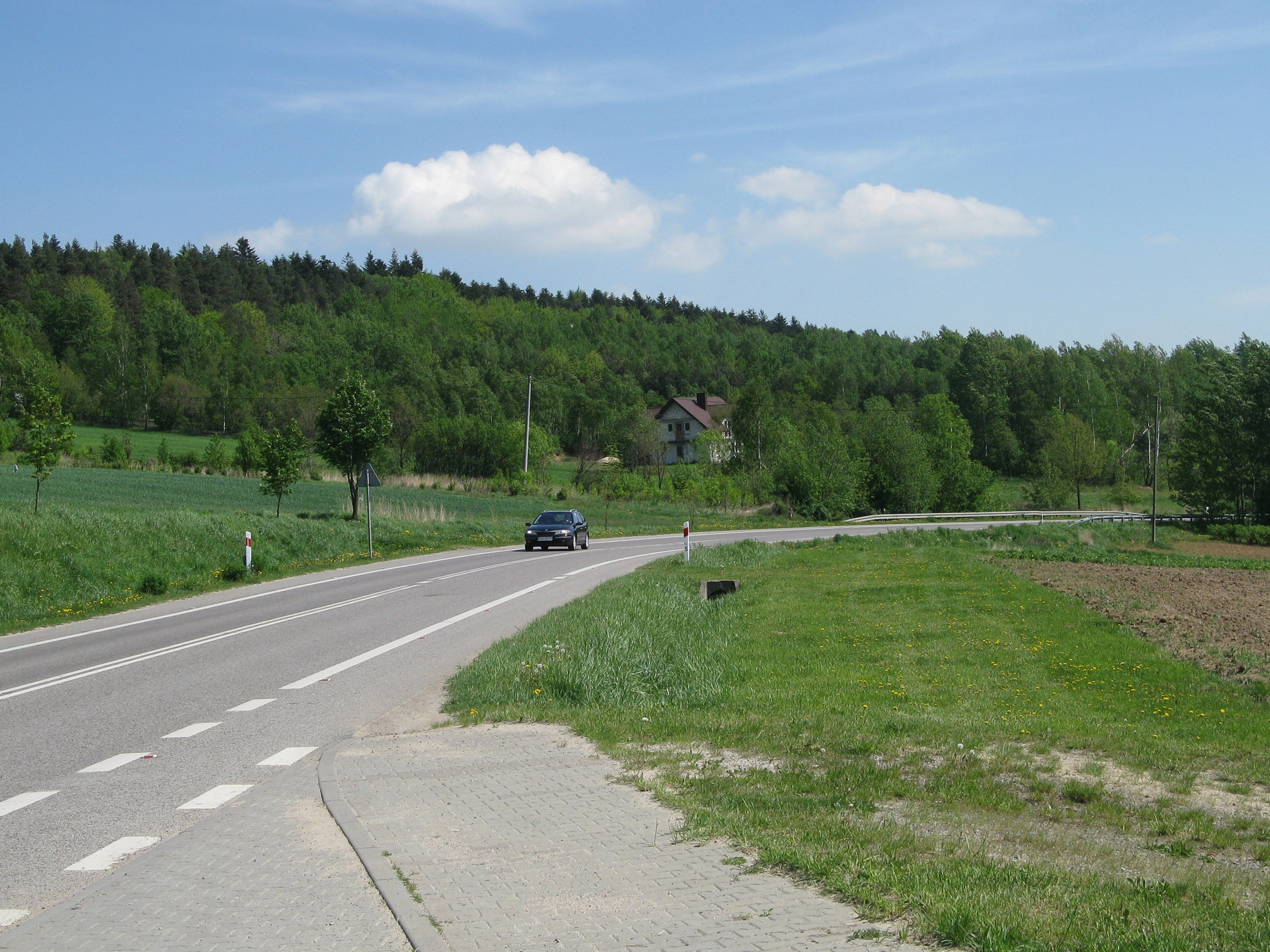

- Location within Poland
- Coordinates: 50°50′35″N 21°4′7″E
- Country: Poland
- Voivodeship: Świętokrzyskie
- County: Kielce
- Gmina: Nowa Słupia
- Population: 210

Trzcianka [ˈtʂt͡ɕaŋka] is a village in the administrative district of Gmina Nowa Słupia, within Kielce County, Świętokrzyskie Voivodeship, in south-central Poland. It lies approximately 3 km (2 mi) south-west of Nowa Słupia and 33 km (21 mi) east of the regional capital Kielce.
