= Czyżów, Kielce County =

Czyżów
- Village
- Location within Poland
- Coordinates: 50°44′40″N 21°0′38″E
- Country: Poland
- Voivodeship: Świętokrzyskie
- County: Kielce
- Gmina: Łagów
- Population: 362

Czyżów [ˈt͡ʂɨʐuf] is a village in the administrative district of Gmina Łagów, within Kielce County, Świętokrzyskie Voivodeship, in south-central Poland. It lies approximately 7 km (4 mi) south-west of Łagów and 32 km (20 mi) south-east of the regional capital Kielce.
