= Zamkowa Wola =

- Village
- Location within Poland
- Coordinates: 50°48′58″N 21°4′39″E
- Country: Poland
- Voivodeship: Świętokrzyskie
- County: Kielce
- Gmina: Łagów
- Population: 366

Zamkowa Wola [zamˈkɔva ˈvɔla] is a village in the administrative district of Gmina Łagów, within Kielce County, Świętokrzyskie Voivodeship, in south-central Poland. It lies approximately 5 km (3 mi) north of Łagów and 34 km (21 mi) east of the regional capital Kielce.
