= Kalenice, Poland =

Kalenice
- Village
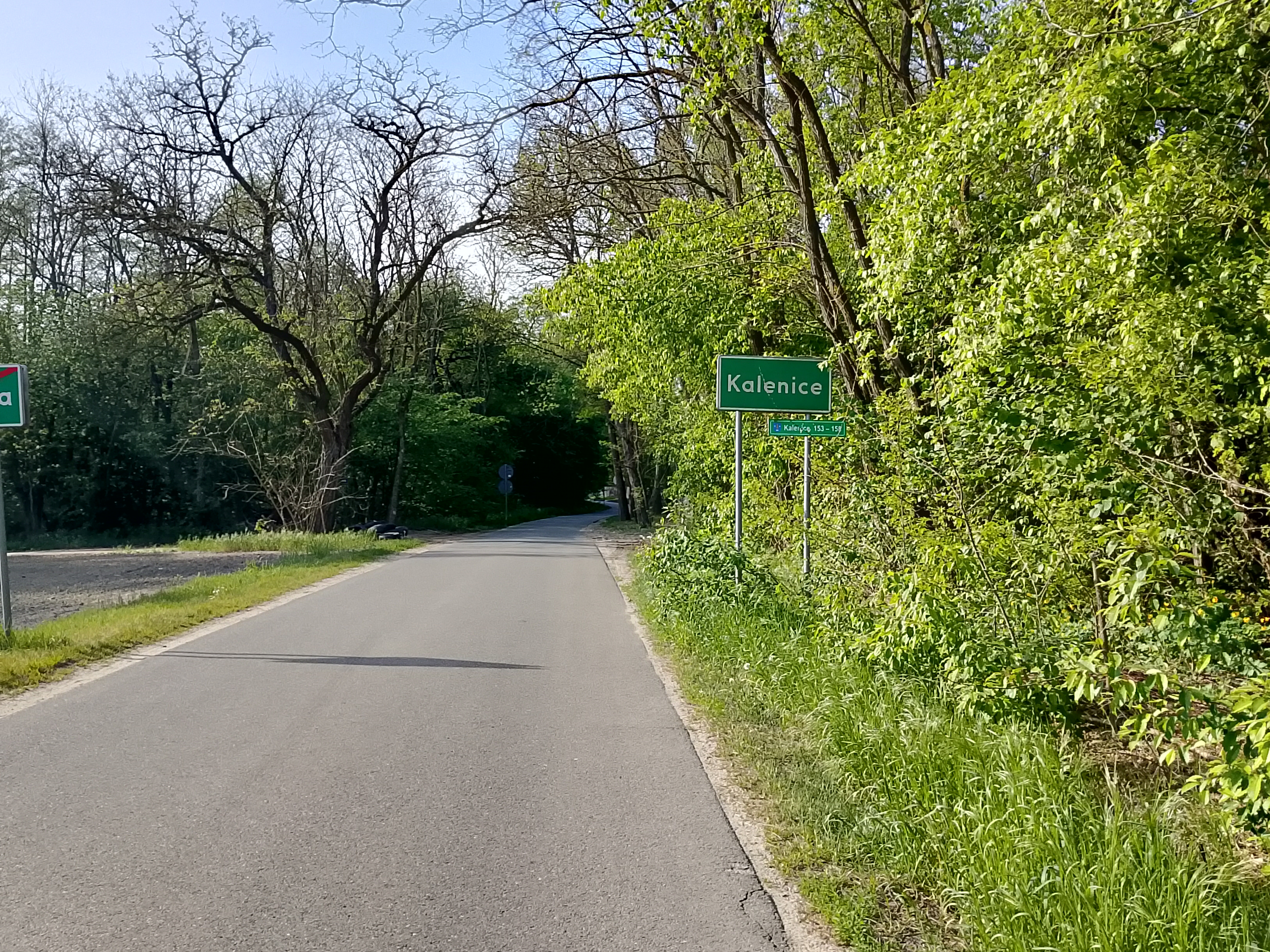

- Location within Poland
- Coordinates: 51°57′33″N 19°53′25″E
- Country: Poland
- Voivodeship: Łódź
- County: Łowicz
- Gmina: Łyszkowice

Kalenice [kalɛˈnit͡sɛ] is a village in the administrative district of Gmina Łyszkowice, within Łowicz County, Łódź Voivodeship, in central Poland.
