= Łagów, Łódź Voivodeship =

Łagów
- Village
- Location within Poland
- Coordinates: 52°0′N 19°56′E
- Country: Poland
- Voivodeship: Łódź
- County: Łowicz
- Gmina: Łyszkowice

Łagów [ˈwaɡuf] is a village in the administrative district of Gmina Łyszkowice, within Łowicz County, Łódź Voivodeship, in central Poland.
