= Gmina Łagów, Świętokrzyskie Voivodeship =

Gmina Łagów Łagów Commune
- Gmina
- Coat of arms
- Interactive map of Gmina Łagów
- Coordinates (Łagów): 50°46′36″N 21°5′6″E
- Country: Poland
- Voivodeship: Świętokrzyskie
- County: Kielce County
- Seat: Łagów

Area
  - Total: 113.03 km^{2} (43.64 sq mi)

Population (2006)
  - Total: 6,899
  - Density: 61.04/km^{2} (158.1/sq mi)
- Website: http://www.lagow-gmina.pl/

Gmina Łagów is a rural gmina (administrative district) in Kielce County, Świętokrzyskie Voivodeship, in south-central Poland. Its seat is the village of Łagów, which lies approximately 35 kilometres (22 mi) east of the regional capital Kielce.

The gmina covers an area of 113.03 square kilometres (43.6 sq mi), and as of 2006 its total population is 6,899.

The gmina contains part of the protected area called Cisów-Orłowiny Landscape Park.

== Villages ==
Gmina Łagów contains the villages and settlements of Czyżów, Duraczów, Gęsice, Łagów, Lechówek, Małacentów, Melonek, Nowa Zbelutka, Nowy Staw, Piotrów, Płucki, Ruda, Sadków, Sędek, Stara Zbelutka, Winna, Wiśniowa, Wola Łagowska, Zamkowa Wola and Złota Woda.

== Neighbouring gminas ==
Gmina Łagów is bordered by the gminas of Baćkowice, Bieliny, Daleszyce, Iwaniska, Nowa Słupia, Raków and Waśniów.
