= Gzinka =

- Village
- Location within Poland
- Coordinates: 52°1′N 19°53′E
- Country: Poland
- Voivodeship: Łódź
- County: Łowicz
- Gmina: Łyszkowice

Gzinka [ˈɡʑinka] is a village in the administrative district of Gmina Łyszkowice, within Łowicz County, Łódź Voivodeship, in central Poland.

== Massacre during Second World War ==
During the German Invasion of Poland in 1939, German forces on 30 September murdered 11 people in the village. .
