= Stare Grudze =

- Village
- Location within Poland
- Coordinates: 52°02′11″N 19°54′25″E
- Country: Poland
- Voivodeship: Łódź
- County: Łowicz
- Gmina: Łyszkowice

Stare Grudze [ˈstarɛ ˈɡrud͡zɛ] is a village in the administrative district of Gmina Łyszkowice, within Łowicz County, Łódź Voivodeship, in central Poland.
