= Jeziorko, Świętokrzyskie Voivodeship =

Jeziorko
- Village
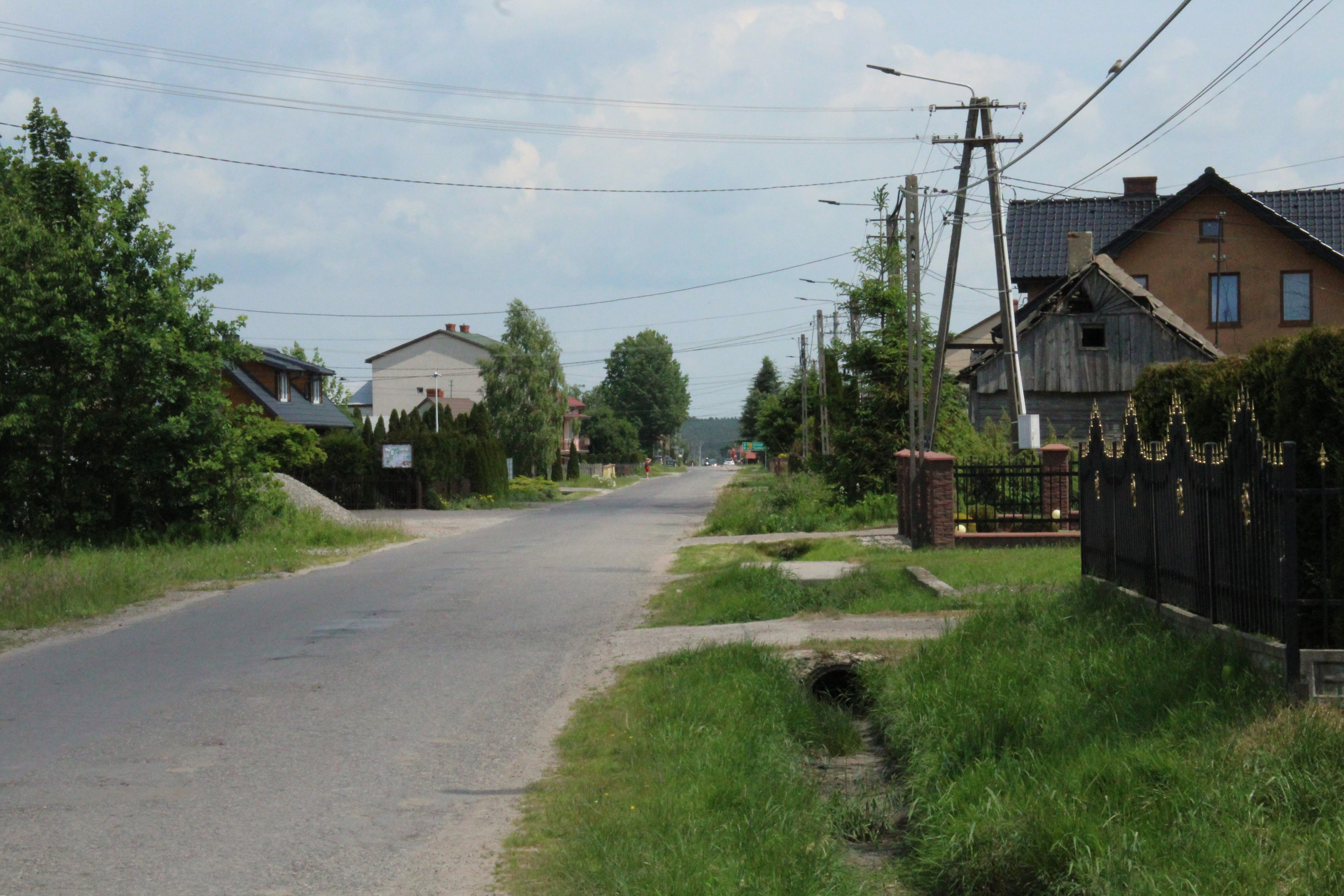

- Location within Poland
- Coordinates: 50°53′37″N 21°0′46″E
- Country: Poland
- Voivodeship: Świętokrzyskie
- County: Kielce
- Gmina: Nowa Słupia
- Population: 940

Jeziorko [jɛˈʑɔrkɔ] is a village in the administrative district of Gmina Nowa Słupia, within Kielce County, Świętokrzyskie Voivodeship, in south-central Poland. It lies approximately 7 km (4 mi) north-west of Nowa Słupia and 28 km (17 mi) east of the regional capital Kielce.
