= Trzcianka, Łódź Voivodeship =

Trzcianka
- Village
- Location within Poland
- Coordinates: 51°56′4″N 19°51′29″E
- Country: Poland
- Voivodeship: Łódź
- County: Łowicz
- Gmina: Łyszkowice

Trzcianka [ˈtʂt͡ɕaŋka] is a village in the administrative district of Gmina Łyszkowice, within Łowicz County, Łódź Voivodeship, in central Poland.
