= Bobrowa, Łódź Voivodeship =

Bobrowa
- Village
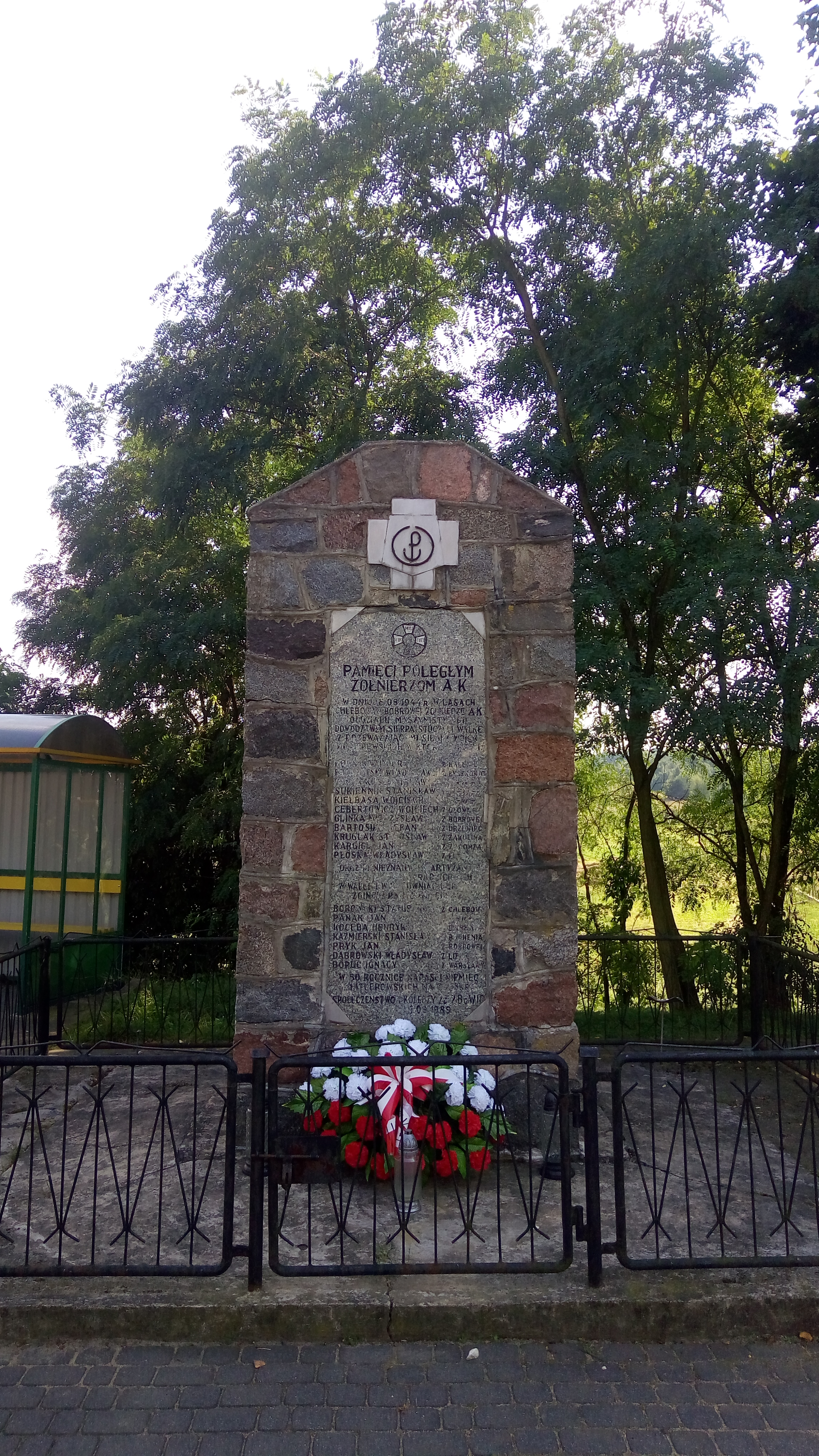

- Location within Poland
- Coordinates: 51°56′07″N 19°54′17″E
- Country: Poland
- Voivodeship: Łódź
- County: Łowicz
- Gmina: Łyszkowice

Bobrowa [bɔˈbrɔva] is a village in the administrative district of Gmina Łyszkowice, within Łowicz County, Łódź Voivodeship, in central Poland.
