= Wrzeczko =

- Village
- Location within Poland
- Coordinates: 52°0′N 19°54′E
- Country: Poland
- Voivodeship: Łódź
- County: Łowicz
- Gmina: Łyszkowice

Wrzeczko [ˈvʐɛt͡ʂkɔ] is a village in the administrative district of Gmina Łyszkowice, within Łowicz County, Łódź Voivodeship, in central Poland.
