= Nowa Słupia =

- Town
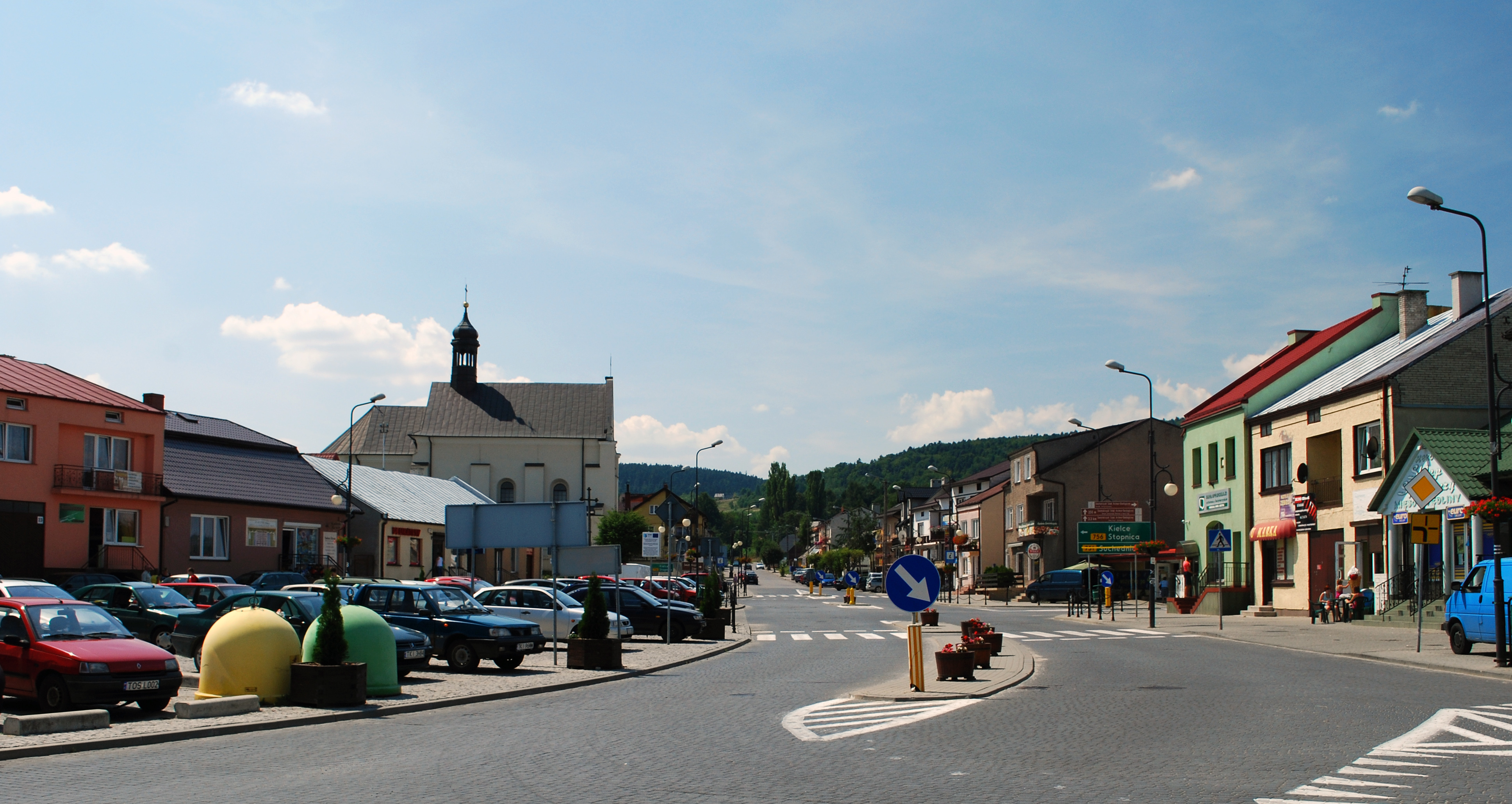

- Coat of arms

- Location within Poland
- Coordinates: 50°51′45″N 21°5′13″E
- Country: Poland
- Voivodeship: Świętokrzyskie
- County: Kielce
- Gmina: Nowa Słupia
- Town rights: 1351

Population (approx.)
  - Total: 1,600
- Time zone: UTC+1 (CET)
  - Summer (DST): UTC+2 (CEST)
- Vehicle registration: TKI
- Website: http://www.nowaslupia.pl/

Nowa Słupia [ˈnɔva ˈswupja] is a town in Kielce County, Świętokrzyskie Voivodeship, in south-central Poland. It is the seat of the gmina (administrative district) called Gmina Nowa Słupia. It lies approximately 34 km (21 mi) east of the regional capital Kielce.

== History ==
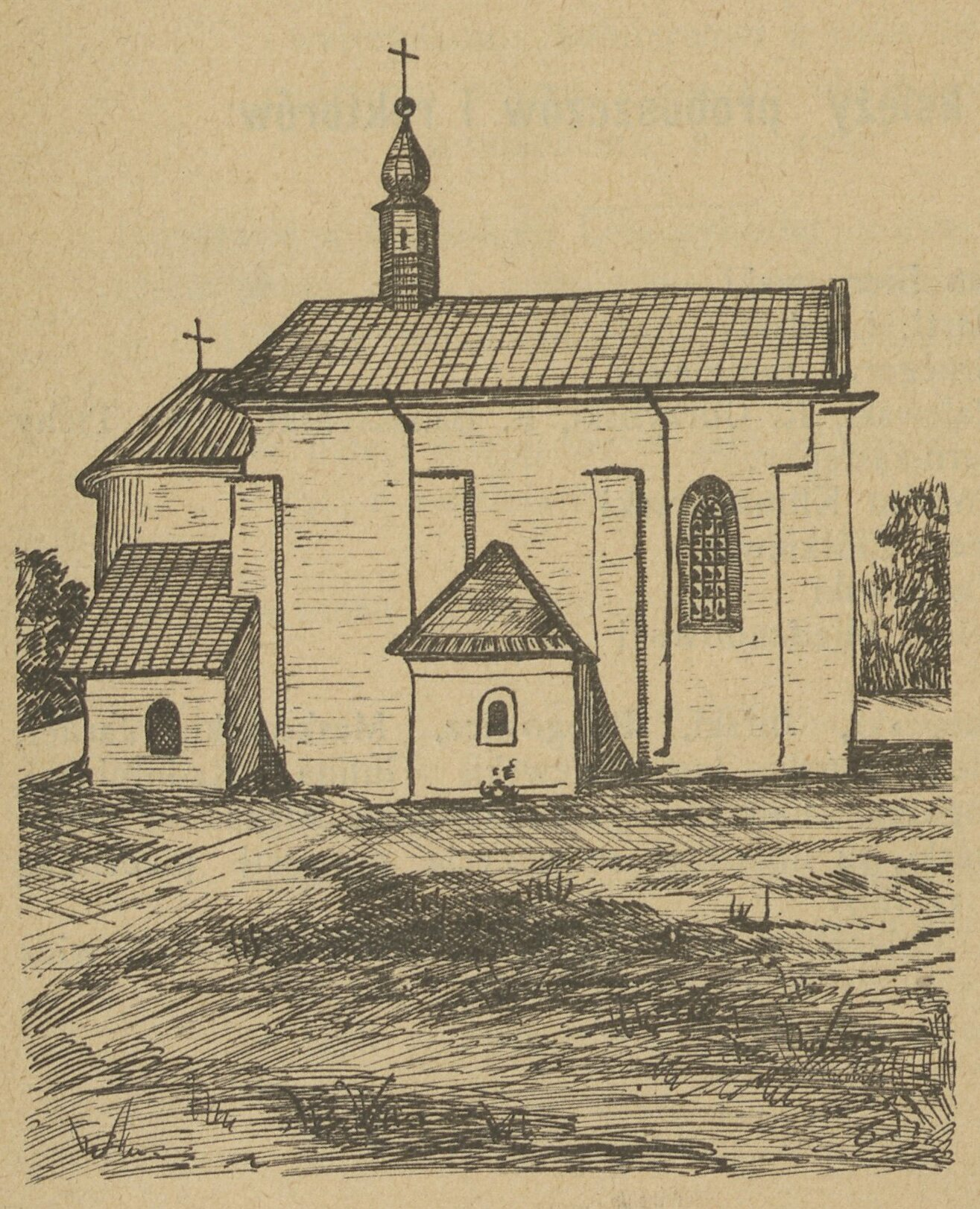
Saint Lawrence church before 1907

Nowa Słupia, which in the past was known as Słup and Słupia Nowa, has a long and rich history, and used to be a town from 1351 to 1869. The village is located in the Swietokrzyskie Mountains, at the foothills of Łysa Góra, the second highest peak of the mountains. Nowa Słupia borders Swietokrzyski National Park. The village, which is a junction of three regional roads (751th, 753rd and 756th), is a starting point of several tourist trails.

In the 13th and 14th centuries, Nowa Słupia belonged to the Święty Krzyż Benedictine Abbey, and at that time the village was called Słup. In 1351, due to efforts of Benedictine abbots, King Casimir III the Great granted town charter to Slup. The new town's name was changed into Słupia Nowa, to distinguish it from the nearby village of Słupia, which now is called Stara Słupia. Słupia Nowa developed as a center of services for pilgrims, who headed to Święty Krzyż. Among the pilgrims, was King Władysław II Jagiełło. In 1405, Słupia received a privilege for weekly fairs. The town prospered in the period known as Polish Golden Age, and in 1578 it had 21 workshops with a mill. The town was administratively located in the Sandomierz Voivodeship in the Lesser Poland Province.

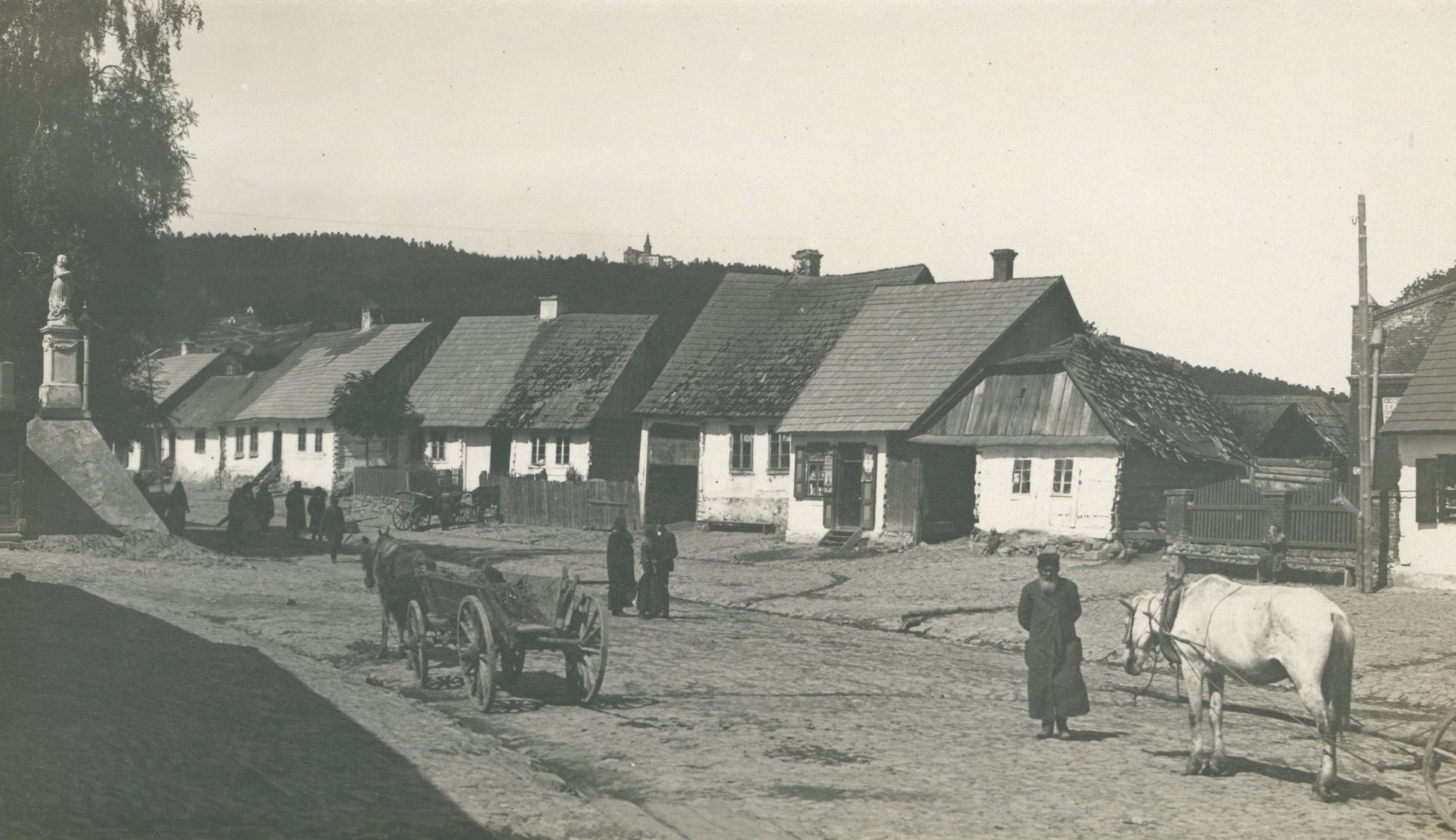
A street in the 1920s

Following the late-18th-century Partitions of Poland, the town then briefly belonged to the Habsburg Empire. After the Polish victory in the Austro-Polish War of 1809, it became part of the short-lived Duchy of Warsaw, and after the duchy's dissolution, it was part of Russian-controlled Congress Poland from 1815 to 1915. In 1819, the Święty Krzyż Abbey was closed, which resulted in decline of the town. In 1869, following the January Uprising, Nowa Słupia was reduced to the status of a village, together with several other locations in northern Lesser Poland. Before World War II, the village had a population of 3,350, and was part of Kielce Voivodeship. In 1929, almost the whole village burned in a fire. During the war, Nowa Słupia was an important center of the Home Army and other anti-German organizations. In July 1943, Germans pacified the village, murdering 200 residents.

=== Jewish community ===
Jews first came to Nowa Słupia at the end of the 18th century. A wooden synagogue was built in the town in 1858 and soon after Rabbi Efroim Hercyk served as the town's first rabbi. He was the first cousin of Rabbi Yitzchak Meir Alter (founder of Ger Hasidism) and brought Ger Hasidism to Nowa Słupia. In the 1920s, Rabbi Wolf Dawid Dychwald became the town's rabbi and introduced the Mizrachi movement to the town. In 1929 the town's synagogue burnt down and a new one was built in 1931. The Nowa Słupia Jewish community served as a hub for Jews in Dębno, Jeziorko, Hucisko, Sosnówka, Wólka and Mirocice. Most of the Jews in the town made their living through craft, trade and agriculture and Jews were allowed to participate in Polish guilds. The community had an organized management committee.

During World War II, the German occupiers operated a forced labour camp for Jews in the town. During the Holocaust, the entirety of the town's Jewish population was murdered by the German occupiers.

== Sights ==
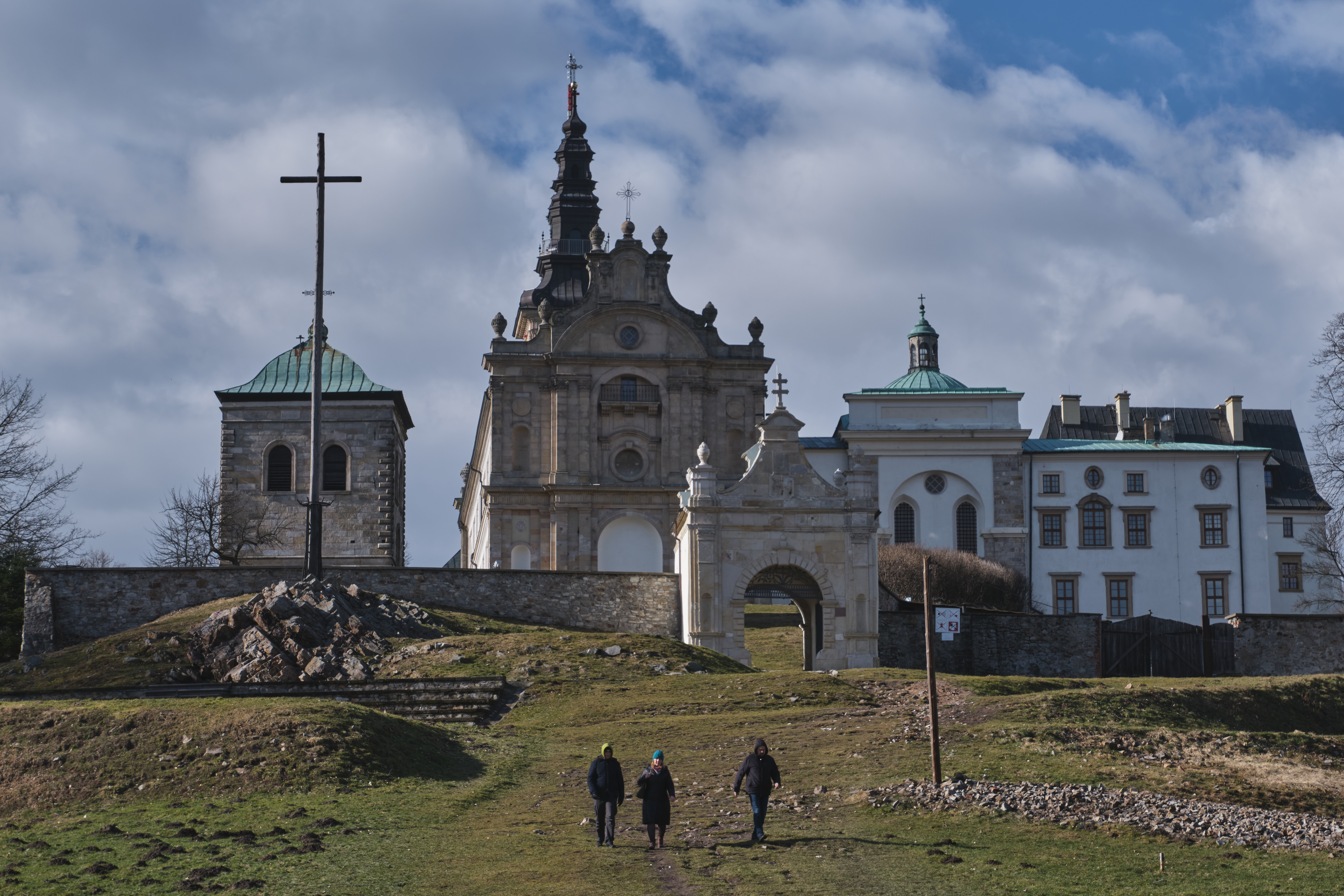
Święty Krzyż Monastery

The Święty Krzyż Monastery, a Historic Monument of Poland, is located in Nowa Słupia.

Currently, Nowa Słupia is a tourist center, with Mieczyslaw Radwan Museum of Old-Polish Steel Mills, opened in 1960. Every year, a festival called Dymarki Swietokrzyskie (Holy Cross Bloomeries) is organized here in mid-August, at an open-air museum, Archeological – and Cultural Center. One of major local points of interest is the so-called Stone Pilgrim (Kamienny pielgrzym), a stone figure of a kneeling man, located near main entrance to the National Park. According to a legend, the figure once was a vain knight, who went on a pilgrimage to the abbey. Upon hearing the sound of the bells, he stated that they tolled in his honor, for which he was punished and turned into stone. The figure moves towards the summit at a pace of one grain of sand a year, and it will reach the top at the end of the world. Nowa Słupia also has the St. Lawrence parish church (1678).
