= Łagów, Świętokrzyskie Voivodeship =

Łagów
- Town
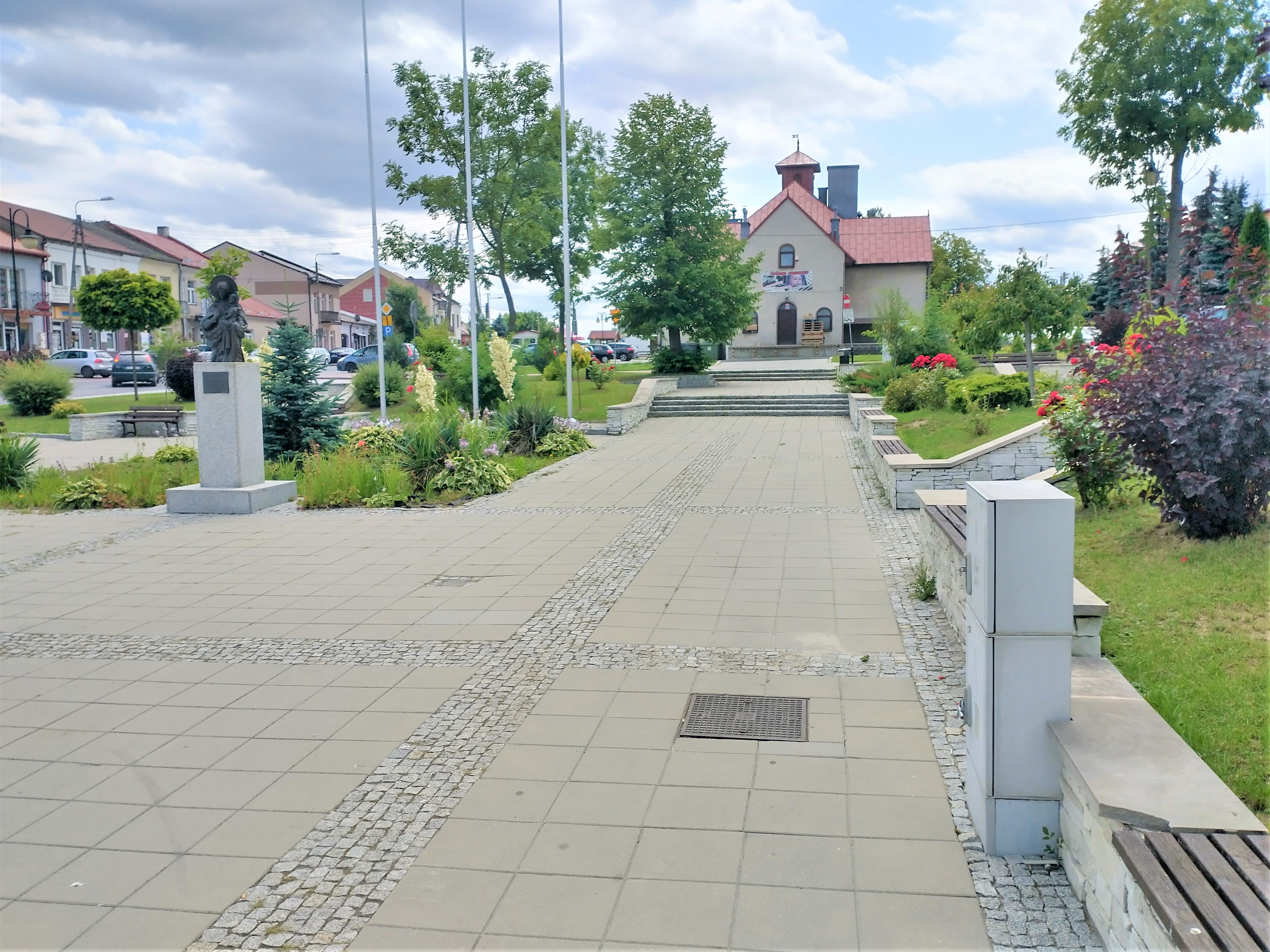
- Town center

- Coat of arms

- Location within Poland
- Coordinates: 50°46′36″N 21°5′6″E
- Country: Poland
- Voivodeship: Świętokrzyskie
- County: Kielce
- Gmina: Łagów

Population
  - Total: 1,630
- Time zone: UTC+1 (CET)
  - Summer (DST): UTC+2 (CEST)
- Vehicle registration: TKI
- Website: http://www.lagow-gmina.pl/

Łagów [ˈwaɡuf] is a town in Kielce County, Świętokrzyskie Voivodeship, in south-central Poland. It is the seat of the gmina (administrative district) called Gmina Łagów. It lies approximately 35 km (22 mi) east of the regional capital Kielce.

It lies at the eastern edge off the Swietokrzyskie Mountains, along National Road Nr. 74, which goes from Kielce to Zamość. Historically, Łagów belongs to Lesser Poland.

== History ==
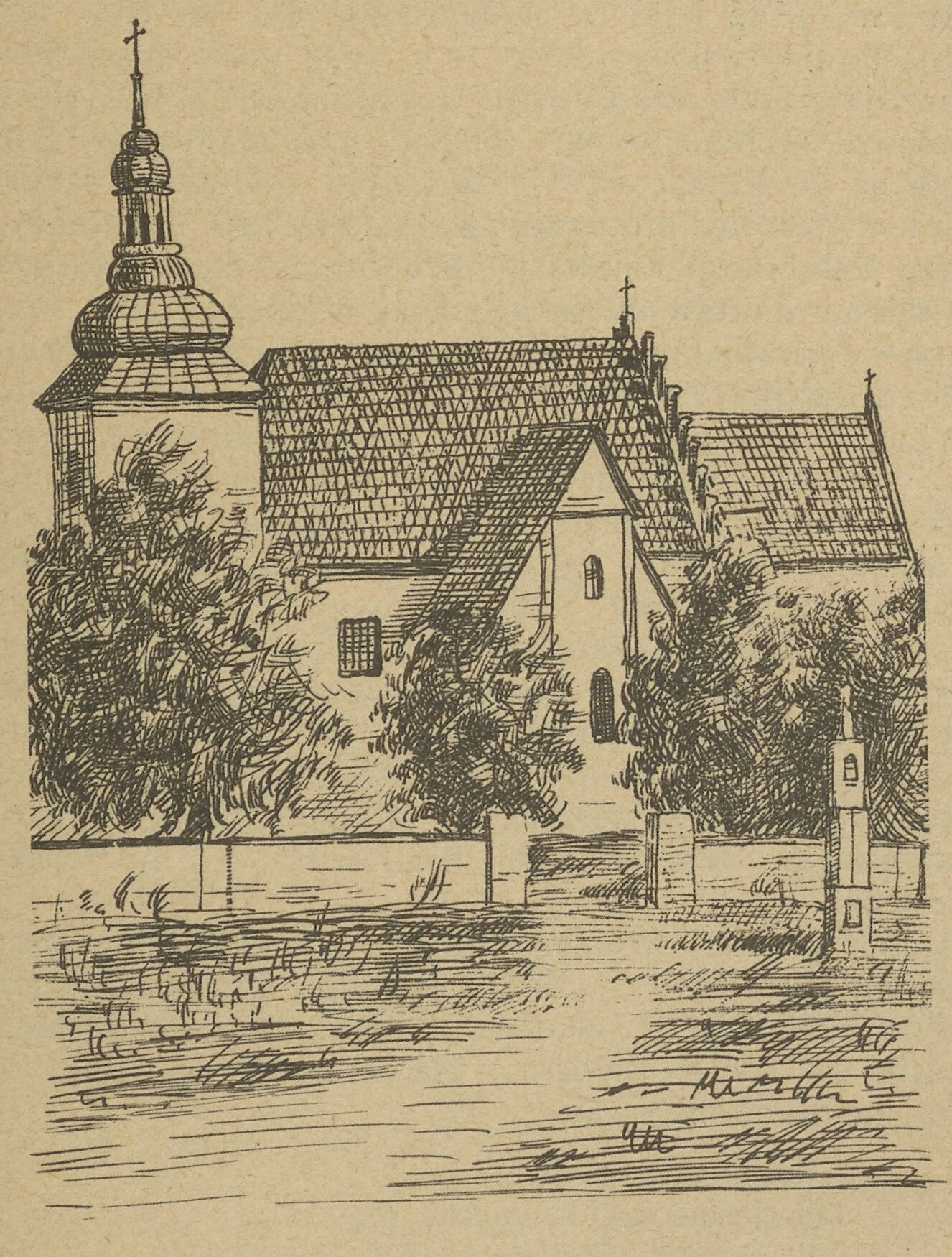
Saint Michael Archangel church, before 1907

According to Jan Długosz, in the year 1085 Prince Władysław I Herman gave the settlement of Łagów to the bishops of Włocławek. The name of the village was first mentioned in documents from 1148 ("cum castro Lagow"), and it probably comes from a man named Łag or Łaga. Sometime before 1230, a church was erected here, together with a Roman Catholic parish. By 1340, the Parish of Łagów had an area of 174 km^{2} (67 sq mi), and was very sparsely populated, due to the poor quality of soil and extensive forests.

Lagow received Magdeburg rights on April 9, 1253, which makes it one of the oldest towns in Lesser Poland. This was due to the efforts of Duke of Kraków and Sandomierz, Boleslaw V the Chaste, as during his reign, several other locations in Lesser Poland were granted town charters in a short period of time (Bochnia and Łagów in 1253; Kraków in 1257; Skaryszew in 1264; Skała in 1267; Koprzywnica in 1268; Jędrzejów and Opatowiec in 1271; Mstow in 1278, Nowe Brzesko in 1279).

In the 14th century, several villages were founded around Łagów (Piotrow, Wola Lagowska, Sadkow, Gesice, Lechowek). On July 28, 1375, Queen Elizabeth of Poland issued a privilege, which allowed the Bishop of Wloclawek to found a new town, located in the area of the village Stary Łagów. The town was named Nowy Łagów, and remained in the hands of the bishops of Wloclawek. In the early 16th century Łagów emerged as a local center of the glass industry, with three plants established here by bishops Maciej Drzewicki and Jan Karnkowski. The town had a voigt, hospital, town hall, and stone church. In the late 16th century, Lagow became famous for its pottery, which was sold as far away as Kraków and Biecz.

Administratively Łagów was part of the Sandomierz Voivodeship in the Lesser Poland Province. In September 1502 the town was burned in a Crimean Tatar raid, but it was quickly rebuilt, and exempted from all taxes for the period of 12 years. In 1534, three iron ore mines and a bloomery operated here. In 1581-1600, Bishop of Wloclawek Henryk Rozdrazewski founded a Gothic – style church. Łagów burned to the ground in ca. 1575, and in ca. 1630, its population was 1,150. Apart from iron ore, lead and lime were mined in the area of the town. Swedish invasion of Poland (1655–1660) brought widespread destruction, followed by an epidemic (1662), which decimated the population. By 1663, the population of Łagów shrank to 170 residents

After the Partitions of Poland, Łagów briefly belonged to the Habsburg Empire, and since 1815 it was part of Russian-controlled Congress Poland. In the 1820s, the government of Congress Poland, on the initiative of Stanisław Staszic, initiated the program of Old-Polish Industrial Region, together with the construction of blast furnaces in Łagów. The program was abandoned due to the November Uprising. The town declined, and following the failed January Uprising, the Russian government reduced it to the status of a village (1869), as a punishment for the support of Polish rebels. In 1884, the population of Łagów was 2,000.

The village, which in the Second Polish Republic belonged to Kielce Voivodeship, was seized by the Wehrmacht on September 7, 1939 (see Invasion of Poland). In late 1944, Łagów was located along front line, which resulted in almost complete destruction of the village, and the death of some 1,500 residents.

== Sights ==
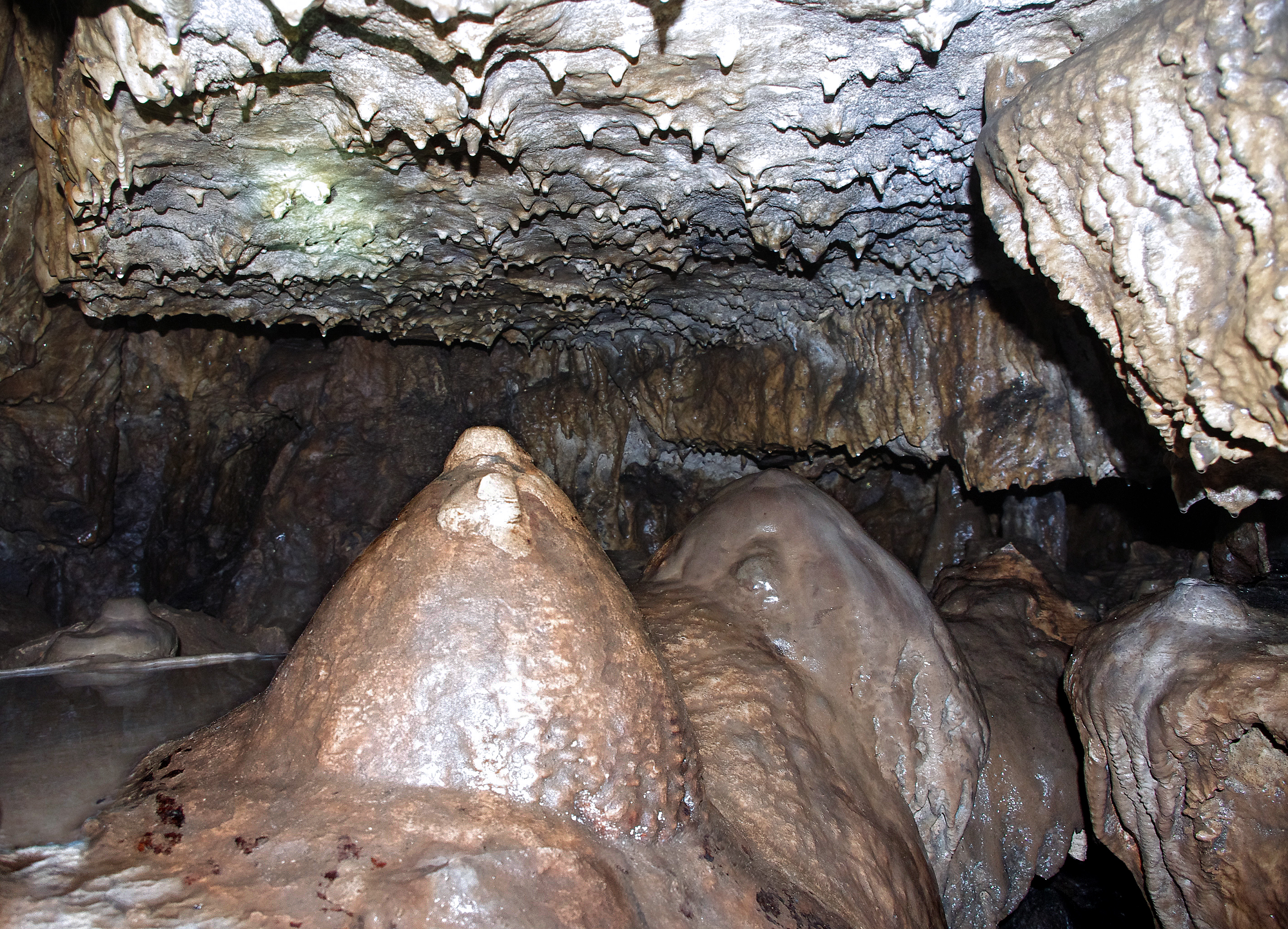
Jaskinia Zbójecka

Among points of interest in Łagów there are:

- 15th-century parish church, with a 17th-century nave and late Renaissance altar (ca. 1600). The church was partly destroyed in September 1944,
- medieval layout of streets, together with a market square,
- 19th-century cemetery, with a chapel,
- Łagów is starting point of blue tourist trails to Chęciny, and green trail to Nowa Słupia.

In the Dule Gorge, near Łagów, there is the so-called Jaskinia Zbójecka (The Robber’s Cave), one of the earliest known caves in the region. Its length is 160 meters, and is located at the height of 312 meters above sea level. Inside there are stalactites and stalagmite, and several kinds of bats. Archaeologists found there pottery and bones of domesticated animals from the 11th or 12th century.
