= Waliszewski =

Waliszewski [valiˈʂɛvski] (with its female form Waliszewska [valiˈʂɛvska] and plural form Waliszewscy [valiˈʂɛvst͡sɨ]) is a Polish surname of toponymic origin, deriving either from Waliszewice, two small villages with the name Waliszew or a third, now defunct Waliszew which later separated into Waliszew Dworski and Stary Waliszew, small settlements in the Łódź and Masovian voivodeships. The stem of the toponym Waliszew is derived from the diminutive form Walisz of the old Polish male name Walisław/Wolisław (from Polish wola "will" and sława "glory").

Notable people with this surname include:

- Aleksandra Waliszewska (born 1976), Polish painter
- Leszek Zygmunt Waliszewski (born 1953), Solidarity Resistance co-founder, businessman
- Kazimierz Waliszewski (1849–1935), Polish author of history
- Zygmunt Waliszewski (1897–1936), Polish painter
