= Marianów =

Marianów may refer to:

- Marianów, Gmina Łanięta in Łódź Voivodeship (central Poland)
- Marianów, Gmina Strzelce in Łódź Voivodeship (central Poland)
- Marianów, Łowicz County in Łódź Voivodeship (central Poland)
- Marianów, Gmina Aleksandrów in Łódź Voivodeship (central Poland)
- Marianów, Gmina Wolbórz in Łódź Voivodeship (central Poland)
- Marianów, Rawa County in Łódź Voivodeship (central Poland)
- Marianów, Gmina Błaszki in Łódź Voivodeship (central Poland)
- Marianów, Gmina Burzenin in Łódź Voivodeship (central Poland)
- Marianów, Gmina Nowy Kawęczyn in Łódź Voivodeship (central Poland)
- Marianów, Gmina Słupia in Łódź Voivodeship (central Poland)
- Marianów, Lublin Voivodeship (east Poland)
- Marianów, Jędrzejów County in Świętokrzyskie Voivodeship (south-central Poland)
- Marianów, Kielce County in Świętokrzyskie Voivodeship (south-central Poland)
- Marianów, Opatów County in Świętokrzyskie Voivodeship (south-central Poland)
- Marianów, Pińczów County in Świętokrzyskie Voivodeship (south-central Poland)
- Marianów, Gostynin County in Masovian Voivodeship (east-central Poland)
- Marianów, Gmina Grójec in Masovian Voivodeship (east-central Poland)
- Marianów, Gmina Chynów in Masovian Voivodeship (east-central Poland)
- Marianów, Gmina Głowaczów in Masovian Voivodeship (east-central Poland)
- Marianów, Gmina Gniewoszów in Masovian Voivodeship (east-central Poland)
- Marianów, Gmina Rzeczniów in Masovian Voivodeship (east-central Poland)
- Marianów, Gmina Solec nad Wisłą in Masovian Voivodeship (east-central Poland)
- Marianów, Warsaw West County in Masovian Voivodeship (east-central Poland)
- Marianów, Węgrów County in Masovian Voivodeship (east-central Poland)
- Marianów, Wołomin County in Masovian Voivodeship (east-central Poland)
- Marianów, Żyrardów County in Masovian Voivodeship (east-central Poland)
- Marianów, Kalisz County in Greater Poland Voivodeship (west-central Poland)
- Marianów, Turek County in Greater Poland Voivodeship (west-central Poland)
- Marianów, Silesian Voivodeship (south Poland)
