= Zulin =

Zulin may refer to the following villages in Poland:

- Żulin, Lublin Voivodeship
- Żulin, Masovian Voivodeship

== See also ==
- Zhulin (disambiguation)
- Zhu Lin (disambiguation)
