= Zhulin =

Zhulin may refer to

- Zhulin (surname), a Russian surname
- Zhuang Zhulin (1900–1973), Chinese educator
- Fayuan Zhulin, a Buddhist encyclopedia
- Zhulin, a village in Wufeng, Hsinchu, Taiwan
- Zhulin, Qichun County (株林镇), a town in Qichun County, Huanggang, Hubei, China
- Zhulin, a village in Stryi Raion, Lviv Oblast, Ukraine

== See also ==
- Zhu Lin (disambiguation)
- Zulin (disambiguation)
