= Niespusza-Wieś =

Village in Gmina Chąśno, Poland

- Village
- Location within Poland
- Coordinates: 52°12′56″N 19°51′38″E
- Country: Poland
- Voivodeship: Łódź
- County: Łowicz
- Gmina: Chąśno

Niespusza-Wieś [ɲɛsˈpuʂa ˈvjɛɕ] is a village in the administrative district of Gmina Chąśno, within Łowicz County, Łódź Voivodeship, in central Poland.
