= Wojewodza =

- Village
- Location within Poland
- Coordinates: 52°4′N 19°43′E
- Country: Poland
- Voivodeship: Łódź
- County: Łowicz
- Gmina: Bielawy

Wojewodza (Polish pronunciation: [vɔjɛˈvɔd͡za]) is a village in the administrative district of Gmina Bielawy, within Łowicz County, Łódź Voivodeship, in central Poland.
