= Janinów =

Janinów may refer to:

- Janinów, Brzeziny County in Łódź Voivodeship (central Poland)
- Janinów, Łowicz County in Łódź Voivodeship (central Poland)
- Janinów, Gmina Rokiciny, Tomaszów County in Łódź Voivodeship (central Poland)
- Janinów, Masovian Voivodeship (east-central Poland)
- Janinów, Greater Poland Voivodeship (west-central Poland)
- Janinów, Opole Voivodeship (south-west Poland)
