= Rogóźno, Łowicz County =

Rogóźno
- Village
- Location within Poland
- Coordinates: 52°2′10″N 19°49′20″E
- Country: Poland
- Voivodeship: Łódź
- County: Łowicz
- Gmina: Domaniewice
- Population: 560

Rogóźno [rɔˈɡuʑnɔ] is a village in the administrative district of Gmina Domaniewice, within Łowicz County, Łódź Voivodeship, in central Poland.
