= Reczyce, Łódź Voivodeship =

Reczyce
- Village
- Location within Poland
- Coordinates: 52°1′N 19°52′E
- Country: Poland
- Voivodeship: Łódź
- County: Łowicz
- Gmina: Domaniewice
- Population: 600

Reczyce [rɛˈt͡ʂɨt͡sɛ] is a village in the administrative district of Gmina Domaniewice, within Łowicz County, Łódź Voivodeship, in central Poland.
