= Bielawska Wieś =

- Village
- Location within Poland
- Coordinates: 52°5′N 19°39′E
- Country: Poland
- Voivodeship: Łódź
- County: Łowicz
- Gmina: Bielawy
- Time zone: UTC+1 (CET)
  - Summer (DST): UTC+2 (CEST)
- Vehicle registration: ELC

Bielawska Wieś [bjɛˈlafska ˈvjɛɕ] is a village in the administrative district of Gmina Bielawy, within Łowicz County, Łódź Voivodeship, in central Poland.

It was a private village of Polish nobility, administratively located in the Orłów County in the Łęczyca Voivodeship in the Greater Poland Province of the Kingdom of Poland.
