= Sobocka Wieś =

- Village
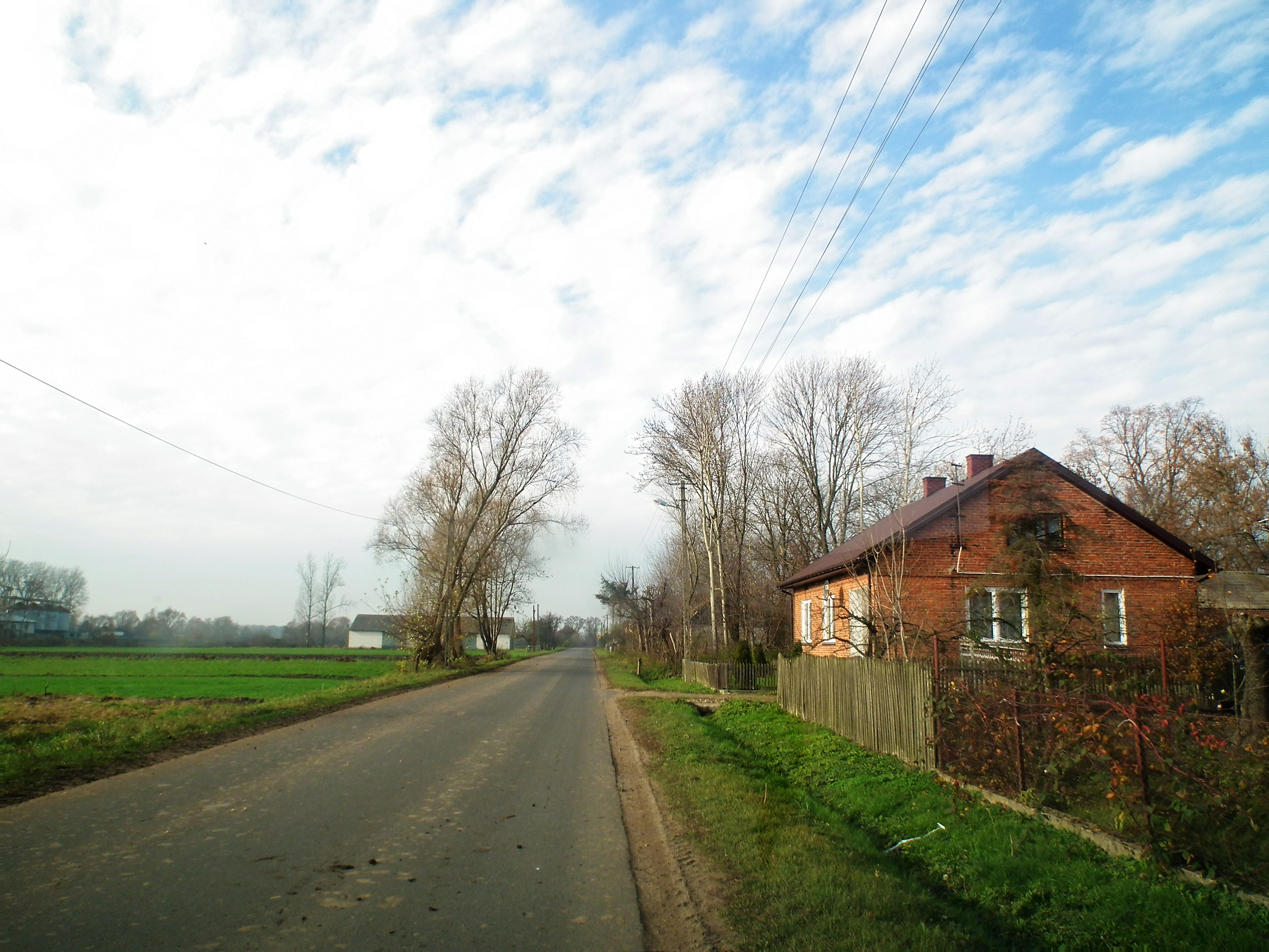
- Sobocka Wieś

- Location within Poland
- Coordinates: 52°6′N 19°44′E
- Country: Poland
- Voivodeship: Łódź
- County: Łowicz
- Gmina: Bielawy

Sobocka Wieś [sɔˈbɔt͡ska ˈvjɛɕ] is a village in the administrative district of Gmina Bielawy, within Łowicz County, Łódź Voivodeship, in central Poland.
