= Brodne-Towarzystwo =

- Village
- Location within Poland
- Coordinates: 52°16′0″N 19°54′4″E
- Country: Poland
- Voivodeship: Łódź
- County: Łowicz
- Gmina: Kiernozia

Brodne-Towarzystwo [ˈbrɔdnɛ tɔvaˈʐɨstfɔ] is a village in the administrative district of Gmina Kiernozia, within Łowicz County, Łódź Voivodeship, in central Poland.
