= Teresew =

- Village
- Location within Poland
- Coordinates: 52°14′56″N 19°49′07″E
- Country: Poland
- Voivodeship: Łódź
- County: Łowicz
- Gmina: Kiernozia

Teresew [tɛˈrɛsɛf] is a village in the administrative district of Gmina Kiernozia, within Łowicz County, Łódź Voivodeship, in central Poland.
