= Sierżniki =

- Village
- Location within Poland
- Coordinates: 52°10′N 19°57′E
- Country: Poland
- Voivodeship: Łódź
- County: Łowicz
- Gmina: Chąśno

Sierżniki [ɕɛrʐˈniki] is a village in the administrative district of Gmina Chąśno, within Łowicz County, Łódź Voivodeship, in central Poland.
