= Lisiewice Duże =

Village in Gmina Domaniewice, Poland

- Village
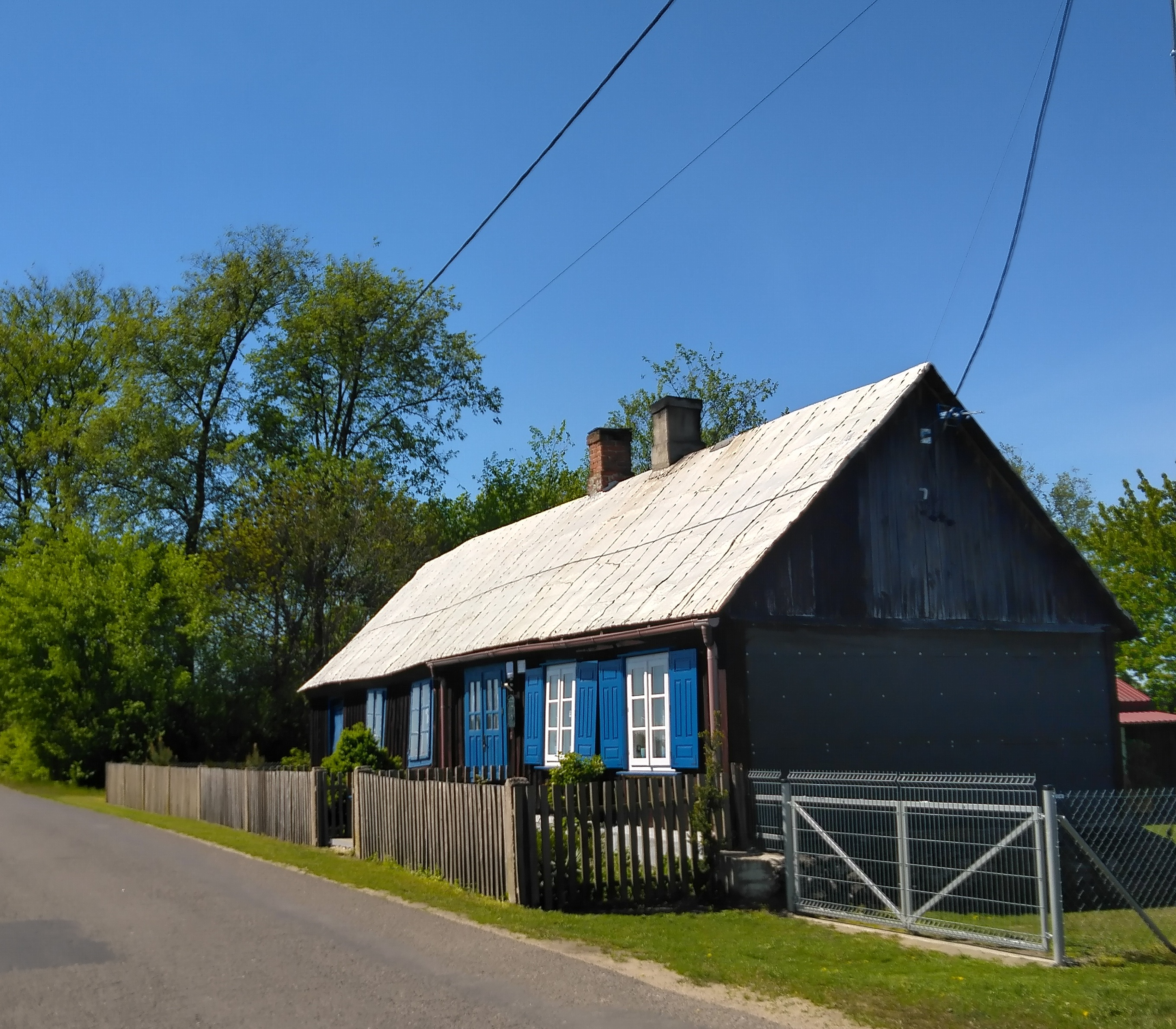

- Location within Poland
- Coordinates: 52°03′51″N 19°46′46″E
- Country: Poland
- Voivodeship: Łódź
- County: Łowicz
- Gmina: Domaniewice

Lisiewice Duże [liɕɛˈvit͡sɛ ˈduʐɛ] is a village in the administrative district of Gmina Domaniewice, within Łowicz County, Łódź Voivodeship, in central Poland.
