= Skaratki =

- Village
- Location within Poland
- Coordinates: 52°1′47″N 19°47′16″E
- Country: Poland
- Voivodeship: Łódź
- County: Łowicz
- Gmina: Domaniewice
- Population: 440

Skaratki [skaˈratki] is a village in the administrative district of Gmina Domaniewice, within Łowicz County, Łódź Voivodeship, in central Poland.
