= Błędów =

Błędów and similar may mean:

== Places in Poland ==
- Błędów, Szczecin
- Błędów, Łódź Voivodeship (central Poland)
- Błędów, Grójec County in Masovian Voivodeship (east-central Poland)
- Błędów, Radom County in Masovian Voivodeship (east-central Poland)
- Błędów, part of Dąbrowa Górnicza

== People ==
- Ludwig Bledow (27 July 1795, Berlin – 6 August 1846), was a German chess master and chess organizer (co-founder of the Berlin Pleiades)
