= Mastki =

- Village
- Location within Poland
- Coordinates: 52°12′31″N 19°53′47″E
- Country: Poland
- Voivodeship: Łódź
- County: Łowicz
- Gmina: Chąśno

Mastki [ˈmastki] is a village in the administrative district of Gmina Chąśno, within Łowicz County, Łódź Voivodeship, in central Poland.
