= Stare Piaski, Łowicz County =

Stare Piaski
- Village
- Location within Poland
- Coordinates: 52°02′56″N 19°33′01″E
- Country: Poland
- Voivodeship: Łódź
- County: Łowicz
- Gmina: Bielawy

Stare Piaski (Polish pronunciation: [ˈstarɛ ˈpjaskʲi]) is a village in the administrative district of Gmina Bielawy, within Łowicz County, Łódź Voivodeship, in central Poland.
