= Sokołów-Kolonia =

- Village
- Location within Poland
- Coordinates: 52°14′0″N 19°50′36″E
- Country: Poland
- Voivodeship: Łódź
- County: Łowicz
- Gmina: Kiernozia

Sokołów-Kolonia [sɔˈkɔwuf kɔˈlɔɲa] is a village in the administrative district of Gmina Kiernozia, within Łowicz County, Łódź Voivodeship, in central Poland.
