= Zakrzew =

Zakrzew may refer to the following places:

- Zakrzew, Łowicz County in Łódź Voivodeship (central Poland)
- Zakrzew, Radomsko County in Łódź Voivodeship (central Poland)
- Zakrzew, Rawa County in Łódź Voivodeship (central Poland)
- Zakrzew, Sieradz County in Łódź Voivodeship (central Poland)
- Zakrzew, Lublin County in Lublin Voivodeship (east Poland)
- Zakrzew, Radzyń County in Lublin Voivodeship (east Poland)
- Zakrzew, Garwolin County in Masovian Voivodeship (east-central Poland)
- Zakrzew, Kozienice County in Masovian Voivodeship (east-central Poland)
- Zakrzew, Radom County in Masovian Voivodeship (east-central Poland)
- Zakrzew, Sochaczew County in Masovian Voivodeship (east-central Poland)
- Zakrzew, Węgrów County in Masovian Voivodeship (east-central Poland)
- Zakrzew, Greater Poland Voivodeship (west-central Poland)
