= Zamiary =

- Village
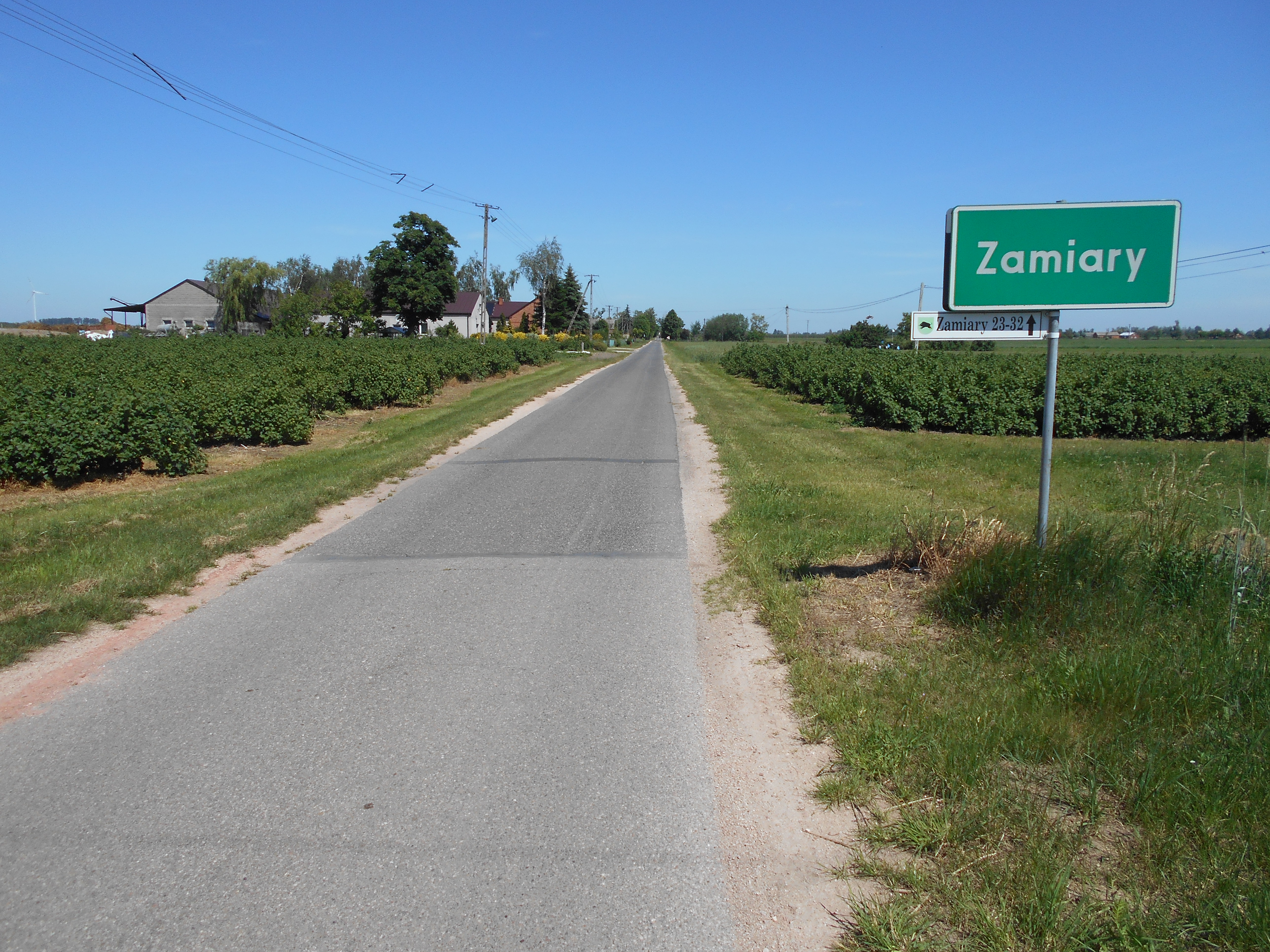

- Location within Poland
- Coordinates: 52°17′29″N 19°54′21″E
- Country: Poland
- Voivodeship: Łódź
- County: Łowicz
- Gmina: Kiernozia

Zamiary [zaˈmjarɨ] is a village in the administrative district of Gmina Kiernozia, within Łowicz County, Łódź Voivodeship, in central Poland.
