= Zgoda =

Zgoda may refer to:

== Places ==
- Zgoda, Kuyavian-Pomeranian Voivodeship (north-central Poland)
- Zgoda, Gmina Łanięta in Łódź Voivodeship (central Poland)
- Zgoda, Gmina Żychlin in Łódź Voivodeship (central Poland)
- Zgoda, Łowicz County in Łódź Voivodeship (central Poland)
- Zgoda, Lublin Voivodeship (east Poland)
- Zgoda, Subcarpathian Voivodeship (south-east Poland)
- Zgoda, Greater Poland Voivodeship (west-central Poland)
- Zgoda, Warmian-Masurian Voivodeship (north Poland)
- Zgoda, West Pomeranian Voivodeship (north-west Poland)
- Zgoda, Swiętochłowice in Silesian Voivodeship (south Poland)
  - Zgoda labour camp, Silesia (south Poland)

== Organizations ==
- Zgoda (electoral alliance), a short-lived 2005 electoral alliance in Poland

== See also ==
- Zhoda, Manitoba, a hamlet
