= Helin, Poland =

Helin
- Village
- Location within Poland
- Coordinates: 52°06′05″N 19°37′18″E
- Country: Poland
- Voivodeship: Łódź
- County: Łowicz
- Gmina: Bielawy

Helin [ˈxɛlin] is a village in the administrative district of Gmina Bielawy, within Łowicz County, Łódź Voivodeship, in central Poland.
