= Skaratki pod Rogóźno =

- Village
- Location within Poland
- Coordinates: 52°2′14″N 19°48′5″E
- Country: Poland
- Voivodeship: Łódź
- County: Łowicz
- Gmina: Domaniewice
- Population: 160

Skaratki pod Rogóźno [skaˈratki ˈpɔt rɔˈɡuʑnɔ] is a village in the administrative district of Gmina Domaniewice, within Łowicz County, Łódź Voivodeship, in central Poland.
