= Brzozów (disambiguation) =

Brzozów may refer to the following places:

- Brzozów, Łowicz County in Łódź Voivodeship (central Poland)
- Brzozów, Skierniewice County in Łódź Voivodeship (central Poland)
- Brzozów in Subcarpathian Voivodeship (south-east Poland)
- Brzozów, Gmina Rzeczyca, Tomaszów County in Łódź Voivodeship (central Poland)
- Brzozów, Siedlce County in Masovian Voivodeship (east-central Poland)
- Brzozów, Sokołów County in Masovian Voivodeship (east-central Poland)
- Brzozów, Lubusz Voivodeship (west Poland)
