= Lisiewice Małe =

- Village
- Location within Poland
- Coordinates: 52°5′N 19°47′E
- Country: Poland
- Voivodeship: Łódź
- County: Łowicz
- Gmina: Domaniewice

Lisiewice Małe [liɕɛˈvit͡sɛ ˈmawɛ] is a village in the administrative district of Gmina Domaniewice, within Łowicz County, Łódź Voivodeship, in central Poland.
