= Emilianów =

Emilianów may refer to the following places:

- Emilianów, Łowicz County in Łódź Voivodeship (central Poland)
- Emilianów, Sieradz County in Łódź Voivodeship (central Poland)
- Emilianów, Gmina Lubochnia, Tomaszów County in Łódź Voivodeship (central Poland)
- Emilianów, Lublin Voivodeship (east Poland)
- Emilianów, Gostynin County in Masovian Voivodeship (east-central Poland)
- Emilianów, Sochaczew County in Masovian Voivodeship (east-central Poland)
- Emilianów, Sokołów County in Masovian Voivodeship (east-central Poland)
- Emilianów, Wołomin County in Masovian Voivodeship (east-central Poland)
- Emilianów, Żyrardów County in Masovian Voivodeship (east-central Poland)
- Emilianów, Greater Poland Voivodeship (west-central Poland)
