= Piotrowice, Łowicz County =

Piotrowice
- Village
- Location within Poland
- Coordinates: 52°4′N 19°44′E
- Country: Poland
- Voivodeship: Łódź
- County: Łowicz
- Gmina: Bielawy

Piotrowice [pjɔtrɔˈvit͡sɛ] is a village in the administrative district of Gmina Bielawy, within Łowicz County, Łódź Voivodeship, in central Poland.
