= Skaratki pod Las =

- Village
- Location within Poland
- Coordinates: 52°02′27″N 19°45′48″E
- Country: Poland
- Voivodeship: Łódź
- County: Łowicz
- Gmina: Domaniewice
- Population: 30

Skaratki pod Las [skaˈratki ˈpɔt ˈlas] is a village in the administrative district of Gmina Domaniewice, within Łowicz County, Łódź Voivodeship, in central Poland.
