= Przezwiska =

- Village
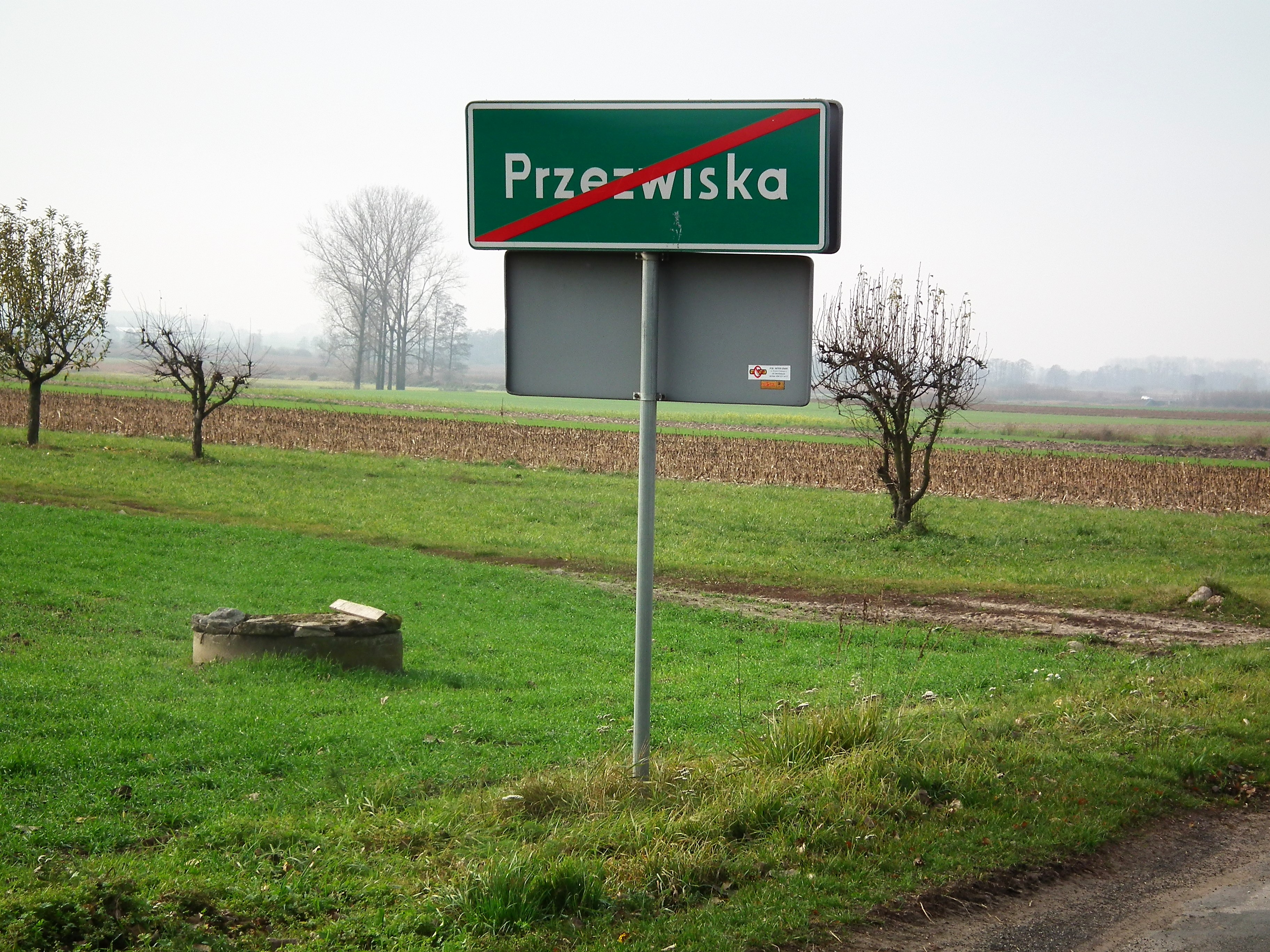

- Location within Poland
- Coordinates: 52°7′N 19°39′E
- Country: Poland
- Voivodeship: Łódź
- County: Łowicz
- Gmina: Bielawy

Przezwiska [pʂɛzˈviska] is a village in the administrative district of Gmina Bielawy, within Łowicz County, Łódź Voivodeship, in central Poland.
