= Karnków =

Karnków may refer to the following places in Poland:

- Karnków, Lower Silesian Voivodeship (south-west Poland)
- Karnków, Łowicz County in Łódź Voivodeship (central Poland)
- Karnków, Zgierz County in Łódź Voivodeship (central Poland)
