= Waliszew =

Waliszew may refer to the following places in Poland:

- Waliszew, Łódź Voivodeship
- Waliszew, Masovian Voivodeship

== See also ==
- Stary Waliszew, Łódź Voivodeship
- Waliszew Dworski, Łódź Voivodeship
