= Skubiki =

- Village
- Location within Poland
- Coordinates: 52°2′N 19°39′E
- Country: Poland
- Voivodeship: Łódź
- County: Łowicz
- Gmina: Bielawy

Skubiki [skuˈbiki] is a village in the administrative district of Gmina Bielawy, within Łowicz County, Łódź Voivodeship, in central Poland.
