= Przemysłów =

Przemysłów may refer to the following places in Poland:

- Przemysłów, Łódź Voivodeship (central Poland)
- Przemysłów, Masovian Voivodeship (east-central Poland)
