= Chruślin =

- Village
- Location within Poland
- Coordinates: 52°4′N 19°45′E
- Country: Poland
- Voivodeship: Łódź
- County: Łowicz
- Gmina: Bielawy

Chruślin [ˈxruɕlin] is a village in the administrative district of Gmina Bielawy, within Łowicz County, Łódź Voivodeship, in central Poland. It has a population of 248.

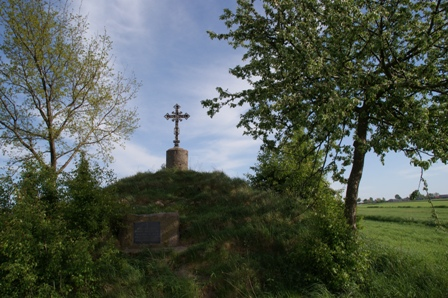
A monument to commemorate

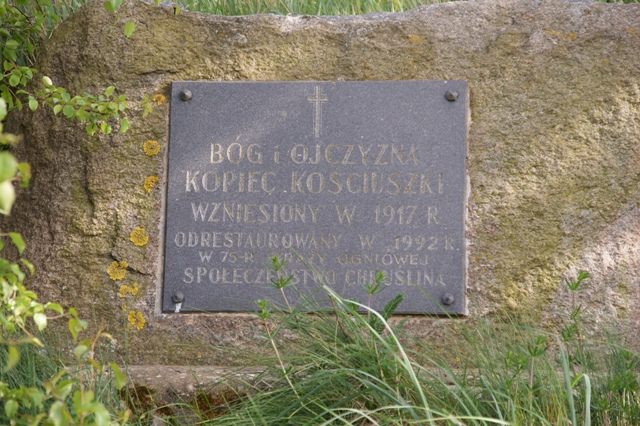
the regaining of independence

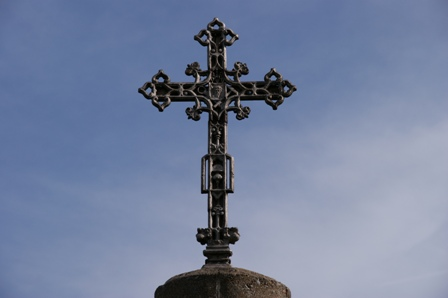
by Poland in 1917.
