= Bogumin, Łódź Voivodeship =

Bogumin
- Village
- Location within Poland
- Coordinates: 52°02′15″N 19°36′04″E
- Country: Poland
- Voivodeship: Łódź
- County: Łowicz
- Gmina: Bielawy

Bogumin ([bɔˈɡumin]) is a village in the administrative district of Gmina Bielawy, within Łowicz County, Łódź Voivodeship, in central Poland.
