= Miednik =

Miednik may refer to:

Places

- Miednik, Masovian Voivodeship, Poland
- Miednik, Pomeranian Voivodeship, Poland

People

- Kasia Miednik, a Polish young girl singer
