= Wola Stępowska =

- Village
- Location within Poland
- Coordinates: 52°16′21″N 19°48′49″E
- Country: Poland
- Voivodeship: Łódź
- County: Łowicz
- Gmina: Kiernozia

Wola Stępowska [ˈvɔla stɛmˈpɔfska] is a village in the administrative district of Gmina Kiernozia, within Łowicz County, Łódź Voivodeship, in central Poland.
