= Krępa, Łowicz County =

Krępa
- Village
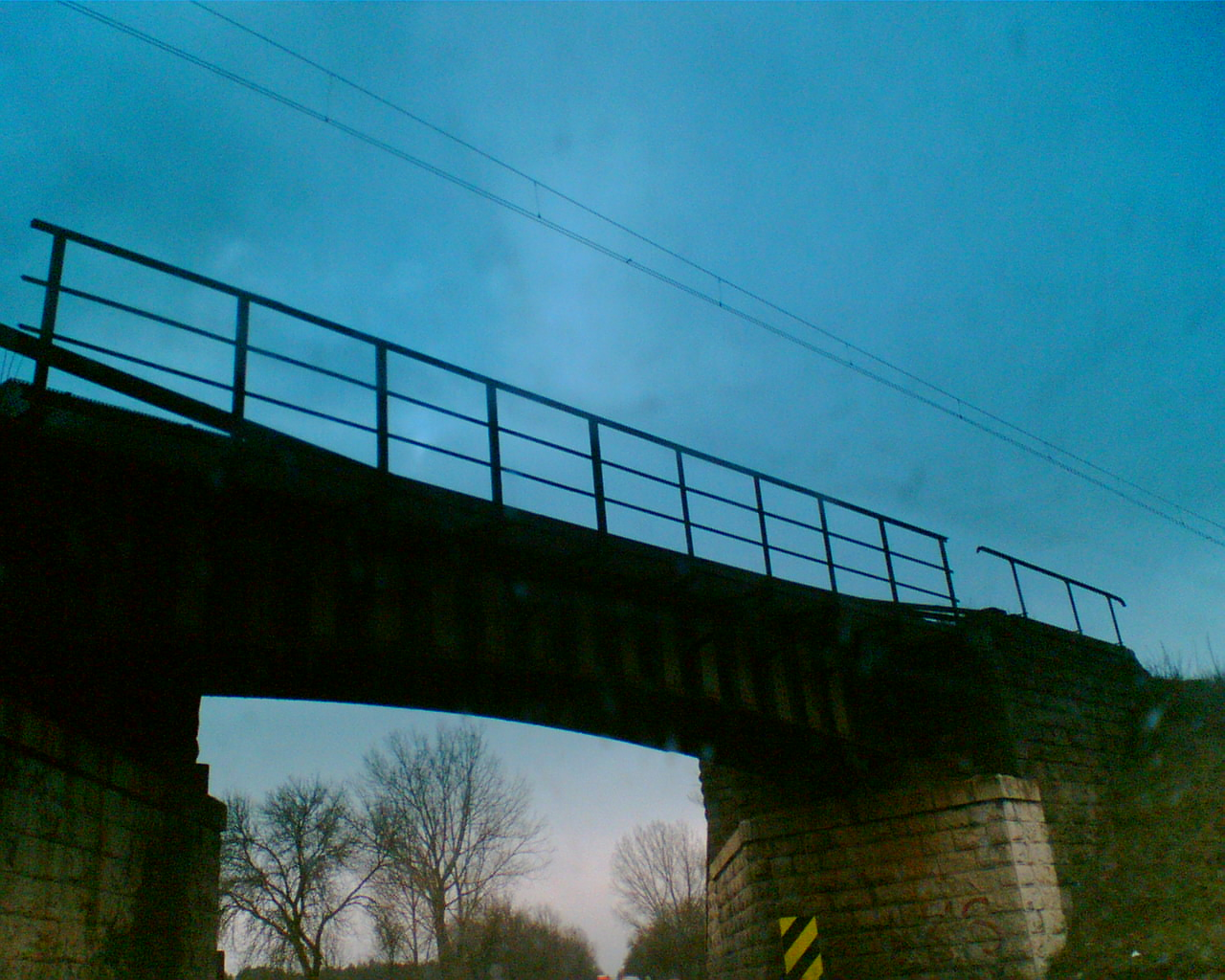
- Railway in Krępa on the Łowicz - Domaniewice route

- Location within Poland
- Coordinates: 52°1′N 19°50′E
- Country: Poland
- Voivodeship: Łódź
- County: Łowicz
- Gmina: Domaniewice

Krępa [ˈkrɛmpa] is a village in the administrative district of Gmina Domaniewice, within Łowicz County, Łódź Voivodeship, in central Poland.
