= Marianka, Łowicz County =

Marianka
- Village
- Location within Poland
- Coordinates: 52°09′47″N 19°54′51″E
- Country: Poland
- Voivodeship: Łódź
- County: Łowicz
- Gmina: Chąśno

Marianka [maˈrjaŋka] is a village in the administrative district of Gmina Chąśno, within Łowicz County, Łódź Voivodeship, in central Poland.
