= Stare Orenice =

- Village
- Location within Poland
- Coordinates: 52°04′46″N 19°32′17″E
- Country: Poland
- Voivodeship: Łódź
- County: Łowicz
- Gmina: Bielawy

Stare Orenice [ˈstarɛ ɔrɛˈnit͡sɛ] is a village in the administrative district of Gmina Bielawy, within Łowicz County, Łódź Voivodeship, in central Poland.
