= Kozolupy =

Kozolupy may refer to:

in the Czech Republic

- Kozolupy (Plzeň-North District), a village in the Plzeň Region
- Horní Kozolupy, a village in Tachov District in the Plzeň Region

in Poland

- Kozołupy, a village in Masovian Voivodeship
