= Brodne-Józefów =

- Village
- Location within Poland
- Coordinates: 52°15′47″N 19°55′45″E
- Country: Poland
- Voivodeship: Łódź
- County: Łowicz
- Gmina: Kiernozia

Brodne-Józefów (Polish pronunciation: [ˈbrɔdnɛ juˈzɛfuf]) is a village in the administrative district of Gmina Kiernozia, within Łowicz County, Łódź Voivodeship, in central Poland.
