= Traby =

- Village
- Location within Poland
- Coordinates: 52°04′25″N 19°45′21″E
- Country: Poland
- Voivodeship: Łódź
- County: Łowicz
- Gmina: Bielawy

Traby [ˈtrabɨ] is a village in the administrative district of Gmina Bielawy, within Łowicz County, Łódź Voivodeship, in central Poland.
