= Żdżary, Łowicz County =

Żdżary
- Village
- Location within Poland
- Coordinates: 52°3′27″N 19°34′56″E
- Country: Poland
- Voivodeship: Łódź
- County: Łowicz
- Gmina: Bielawy

Żdżary [ˈʐd͡ʐarɨ] is a village in the administrative district of Gmina Bielawy, within Łowicz County, Łódź Voivodeship, in central Poland.
