= Borówek =

Borówek may refer to the following places in Poland:

- Borówek, Lower Silesian Voivodeship (south-west Poland)
- Borówek, Lublin Voivodeship (east Poland)
- Borówek, Łódź Voivodeship (central Poland)
- Borówek, Gmina Latowicz in Masovian Voivodeship (east-central Poland)
- Borówek, Gmina Siennica in Masovian Voivodeship (east-central Poland)
