= Goleńsko =

- Village
- Location within Poland
- Coordinates: 52°9′N 19°56′E
- Country: Poland
- Voivodeship: Łódź
- County: Łowicz
- Gmina: Chąśno

Goleńsko [ɡɔˈlɛɲskɔ] is a village in the administrative district of Gmina Chąśno, within Łowicz County, Łódź Voivodeship, in central Poland.

== Administration ==
From 1975 to 1998, the village was administratively part of the former Skierniewice Voivodeship.

Since 1999, it has been part of the new Łódź Voivodeship.
