= Strzebieszew =

- Village
- Location within Poland
- Coordinates: 52°0′N 19°45′E
- Country: Poland
- Voivodeship: Łódź
- County: Łowicz
- Gmina: Domaniewice

Strzebieszew [stʂɛˈbjɛʂɛf] is a village in the administrative district of Gmina Domaniewice, within Łowicz County, Łódź Voivodeship, in central Poland.
