= Karsznice Małe =

- Village
- Location within Poland
- Coordinates: 52°14′N 19°52′E
- Country: Poland
- Voivodeship: Łódź
- County: Łowicz
- Gmina: Chąśno

Karsznice Małe [karʂˈnit͡sɛ ˈmawɛ] is a village in the administrative district of Gmina Chąśno, within Łowicz County, Łódź Voivodeship, in central Poland.
