= Jerzewo, Łódź Voivodeship =

Jerzewo
- Village
- Location within Poland
- Coordinates: 52°15′1″N 19°55′28″E
- Country: Poland
- Voivodeship: Łódź
- County: Łowicz
- Gmina: Kiernozia

Jerzewo [jɛˈʐɛvɔ] is a village in the administrative district of Gmina Kiernozia, within Łowicz County, Łódź Voivodeship, in central Poland.
