= Leśniczówka =

Leśniczówka may refer to the following places:

- Leśniczówka, Chełm County in Lublin Voivodeship (east Poland)
- Leśniczówka, Kraśnik County in Lublin Voivodeship (east Poland)
- Leśniczówka, Lublin County in Lublin Voivodeship (east Poland)
- Leśniczówka, Łódź Voivodeship (central Poland)
- Leśniczówka, Lipsko County in Masovian Voivodeship (east-central Poland)
- Leśniczówka, Siedlce County in Masovian Voivodeship (east-central Poland)
- Leśniczówka, Greater Poland Voivodeship (west-central Poland)
- Leśniczówka, Opole Voivodeship (south-west Poland)
