= Wiśniewo, Łódź Voivodeship =

Wiśniewo
- Village
- Location within Poland
- Coordinates: 52°16′N 19°55′E
- Country: Poland
- Voivodeship: Łódź
- County: Łowicz
- Gmina: Kiernozia

Wiśniewo [viɕˈɲɛvɔ] is a village in the administrative district of Gmina Kiernozia, within Łowicz County, Łódź Voivodeship, in central Poland.
