= Sobota, Łódź Voivodeship =

Sobota
- Village
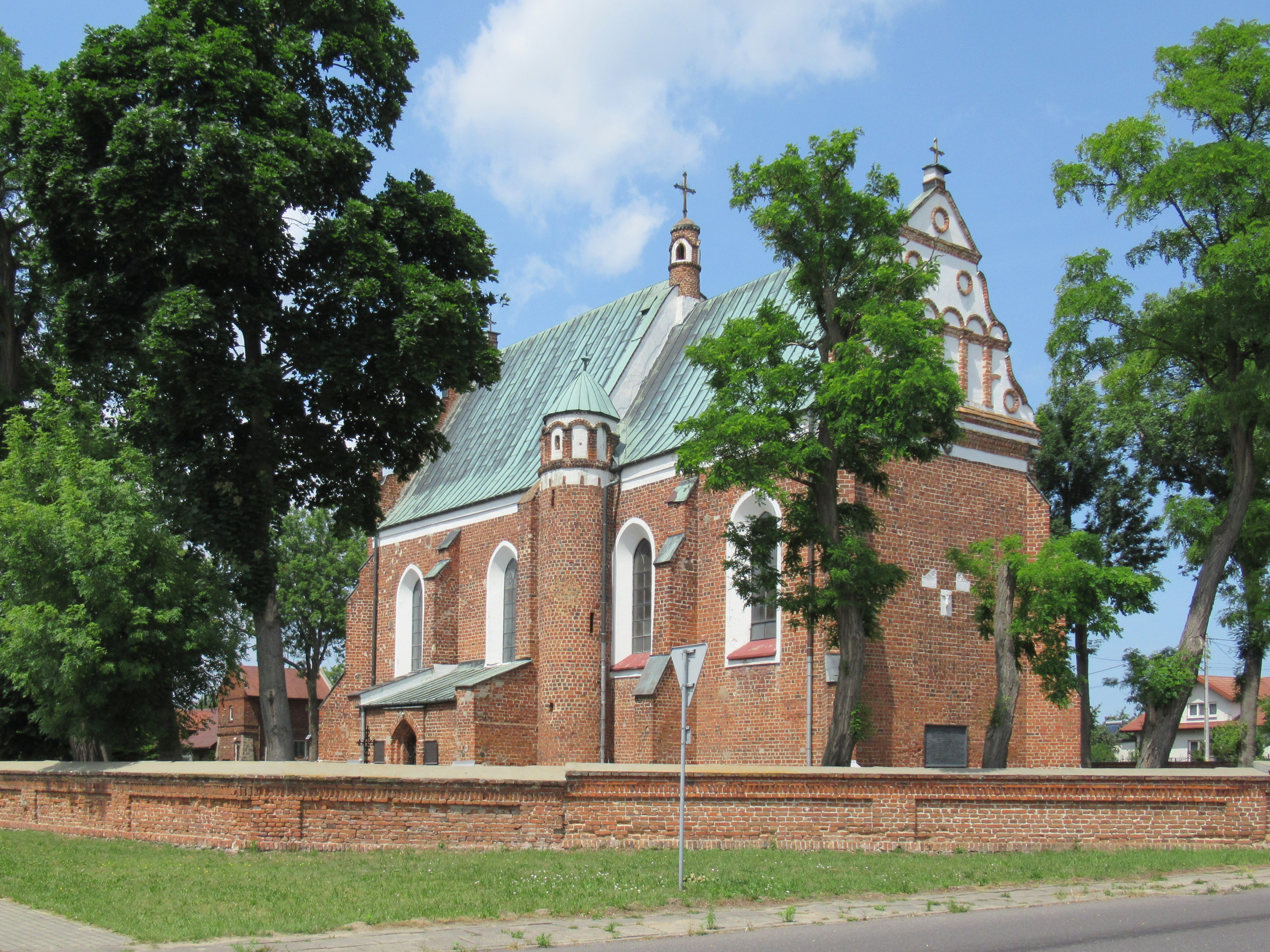
- Saints Peter and Paul church in Sobota

- Coat of arms

- Location within Poland
- Coordinates: 52°6′58″N 19°41′13″E
- Country: Poland
- Voivodeship: Łódź
- County: Łowicz
- Gmina: Bielawy

Population
  - Total: 560
- Time zone: UTC+1 (CET)
  - Summer (DST): UTC+2 (CEST)
- Vehicle registration: ELC

Sobota [sɔˈbɔta] (lit. "Saturday") is a village in the administrative district of Gmina Bielawy, within Łowicz County, Łódź Voivodeship, in central Poland. It is located in Łęczyca Land.

== History ==
It was a private church town, administratively located in the Orłów County in the Łęczyca Voivodeship in the Greater Poland Province of the Kingdom of Poland.

Sobota was the site of the Battle of Sobota (1655), when a Polish force failed to head off the advancing Swedish invading army.
