= Jadzień =

- Village
- Location within Poland
- Coordinates: 52°14′03″N 19°55′06″E
- Country: Poland
- Voivodeship: Łódź
- County: Łowicz
- Gmina: Kiernozia

Jadzień [ˈjad͡ʑɛɲ] is a village in the administrative district of Gmina Kiernozia, within Łowicz County, Łódź Voivodeship, in central Poland. In 2011, its population was 91 people.
