= Psary =

Psary may refer to:

- Psary, Góra County in Lower Silesian Voivodeship (south-west Poland)
- Psary, Legnica County in Lower Silesian Voivodeship (south-west Poland)
- Psary, Oława County in Lower Silesian Voivodeship (south-west Poland)
- Psary, Trzebnica County in Lower Silesian Voivodeship (south-west Poland)
- Psary, a village in Silesian Voivodeship (S Poland)
- Psary, Kuyavian-Pomeranian Voivodeship (central Poland)
- Psary, Łowicz County in Łódź Voivodeship (central Poland)
- Psary, Opoczno County in Łódź Voivodeship (central Poland)
- Psary, Poddębice County in Łódź Voivodeship (central Poland)
- Psary, Skierniewice County in Łódź Voivodeship (central Poland)
- Psary, Chrzanów County in Lesser Poland Voivodeship (south Poland)
- Psary, Świętokrzyskie Voivodeship (south-central Poland)
- Psary, Kozienice County in Masovian Voivodeship (east-central Poland)
- Psary, Płock County in Masovian Voivodeship (north-central Poland)
- Psary, Pułtusk County in Masovian Voivodeship (east-central Poland)
- Psary, Koło County in Greater Poland Voivodeship (central Poland)
- Psary, Gmina Sieroszewice, Ostrów County in Greater Poland Voivodeship (west-central Poland)
- Psary, Turek County in Greater Poland Voivodeship (central Poland)
- Psary, Będzin County in Silesian Voivodeship (south Poland)
- Psary, Lubliniec County in Silesian Voivodeship (south Poland)
- Psary, West Pomeranian Voivodeship (north-west Poland)

== See also ==
- Psáry, municipality and village in the Czech Republic
