= Stępów =

- Village
- Location within Poland
- Coordinates: 52°15′N 19°47′E
- Country: Poland
- Voivodeship: Łódź
- County: Łowicz
- Gmina: Kiernozia

Stępów [ˈstɛmpuf] is a village in the administrative district of Gmina Kiernozia, within Łowicz County, Łódź Voivodeship, in central Poland.
