= Marywil (disambiguation) =

Marywil was a former building complex in Warsaw.

Marywil may also refer to the following villages:

- Marywil, Łódź Voivodeship (central Poland)
- Marywil, Masovian Voivodeship (east-central Poland)
- Marywil, Pomeranian Voivodeship (north Poland)
