= Piaski Bankowe =

- Village
- Location within Poland
- Coordinates: 52°3′N 19°33′E
- Country: Poland
- Voivodeship: Łódź
- County: Łowicz
- Gmina: Bielawy

Piaski Bankowe (Polish pronunciation: [ˈpjaskʲi baŋˈkɔvɛ]) is a village in the administrative district of Gmina Bielawy, within Łowicz County, Łódź Voivodeship, in central Poland.
