= Gosławice =

Gosławice may refer to the following places in Poland:

- Gosławice, Lower Silesian Voivodeship (south-west Poland)
- Gosławice, Kuyavian-Pomeranian Voivodeship (north-central Poland)
- Gosławice, Kutno County in Łódź Voivodeship (central Poland)
- Gosławice, Łowicz County in Łódź Voivodeship (central Poland)
- Gosławice, Radomsko County in Łódź Voivodeship (central Poland)
- Gosławice, Lesser Poland Voivodeship (south Poland)
- Gosławice, Opole Voivodeship (south-west Poland)
- Gosławice, a district of the city of Opole
- Gosławice, a district of Konin (central Poland) and eponymous train station
