= Skowroda Północna =

Village in Gmina Chąśno, Poland

- Village
- Location within Poland
- Coordinates: 52°13′32.26″N 19°56′13.73″E
- Country: Poland
- Voivodeship: Łódź
- County: Łowicz
- Gmina: Chąśno

Skowroda Północna [skɔˈvrɔda puu̯ˈnɔt͡sna] is a village in the administrative district of Gmina Chąśno, within Łowicz County, Łódź Voivodeship, in central Poland.
