= Lasocin =

Lasocin may refer to the following places:

- Lasocin, Łódź Voivodeship (central Poland)
- Lasocin, Lublin Voivodeship (east Poland)
- Lasocin, Kielce County in Świętokrzyskie Voivodeship (south-central Poland)
- Lasocin, Opatów County in Świętokrzyskie Voivodeship (south-central Poland)
- Lasocin, Płock County in Masovian Voivodeship (east-central Poland)
- Lasocin, Sochaczew County in Masovian Voivodeship (east-central Poland)
- Lasocin, Lubusz Voivodeship (west Poland)
- Lasocin, West Pomeranian Voivodeship (north-west Poland)
