= Gmina Stoczek =

Gmina Stoczek Stoczek Commune
- Gmina
- Coat of arms
- Interactive map of Gmina Stoczek
- Coordinates (Stoczek): 52°33′N 21°55′E
- Country: Poland
- Voivodeship: Masovian
- County: Węgrów
- Seat: Stoczek

Area
  - Total: 144.31 km^{2} (55.72 sq mi)

Population (2013)
  - Total: 5,176
  - Density: 35.87/km^{2} (92.90/sq mi)
- Website: http://www.stoczek.net.pl

Gmina Stoczek is a rural gmina (administrative district) in Węgrów County, Masovian Voivodeship, in east-central Poland. Its seat is the village of Stoczek, which lies approximately 18 kilometres (11 mi) north-west of Węgrów and 70 km (43 mi) north-east of Warsaw.

The gmina covers an area of 144.31 square kilometres (55.7 sq mi), and as of 2006 its total population is 5,267 (5,176 in 2013).

== Villages ==
Gmina Stoczek contains the villages and settlements of Błotki, Brzózka, Drgicz, Gajówka Wschodnia, Gajówka Zachodnia, Grabowiec, Gruszczyno, Grygrów, Huta Gruszczyno, Kalaty, Kałęczyn, Kazimierzów, Kozołupy, Majdan, Marianów, Miednik, Mrozowa Wola, Nowe Lipki, Polkowo, Stare Lipki, Stoczek, Topór, Wieliczna, Zgrzebichy, and Żulin.

== Neighbouring gminas ==
Gmina Stoczek is bordered by the gminas of Korytnica, Kosów Lacki, Liw, Łochów, Miedzna, and Sadowne.
