= Bielawy, Łowicz County =

Bielawy
- Village
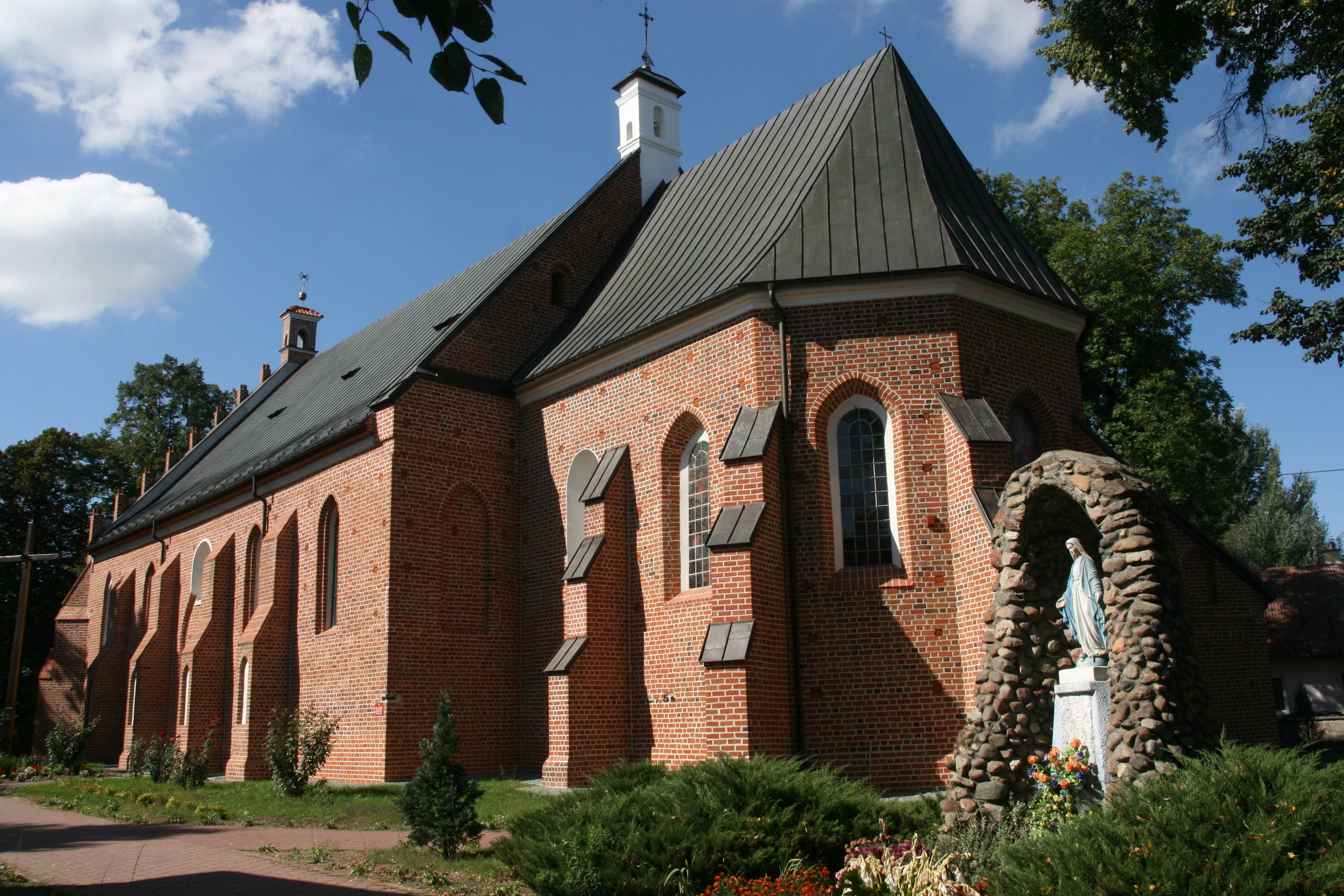
- Church of the Visitation of the Holy Virgin Mary

- Location within Poland
- Coordinates: 52°4′N 19°39′E
- Country: Poland
- Voivodeship: Łódź
- County: Łowicz
- Gmina: Bielawy

Population
  - Total: 620
- Time zone: UTC+1 (CET)
  - Summer (DST): UTC+2 (CEST)
- Vehicle registration: ELC

Bielawy [bjɛˈlavɨ] is a village in Łowicz County, Łódź Voivodeship, in central Poland. It is the seat of the gmina (administrative district) called Gmina Bielawy. It is located in Łęczyca Land.

It was a private church town, administratively located in the Orłów County in the Łęczyca Voivodeship in the Greater Poland Province of the Kingdom of Poland.
