= Polkowo, Masovian Voivodeship =

Polkowo
- Village
- Location within Poland
- Coordinates: 52°34′18″N 21°53′12″E
- Country: Poland
- Voivodeship: Masovian
- County: Węgrów
- Gmina: Stoczek

Polkowo [pɔlˈkɔvɔ] is a village in the administrative district of Gmina Stoczek, within Węgrów County, Masovian Voivodeship, in east-central Poland.
