= Gruszczyno =

- Village
- Location within Poland
- Coordinates: 52°29′N 21°54′E
- Country: Poland
- Voivodeship: Masovian
- County: Węgrów
- Gmina: Stoczek

Gruszczyno [ɡruʂˈt͡ʂɨnɔ] is a village in the administrative district of Gmina Stoczek, within Węgrów County, Masovian Voivodeship, in east-central Poland.
