= Jan Paweł Kruk =

Polish film and theatre actor

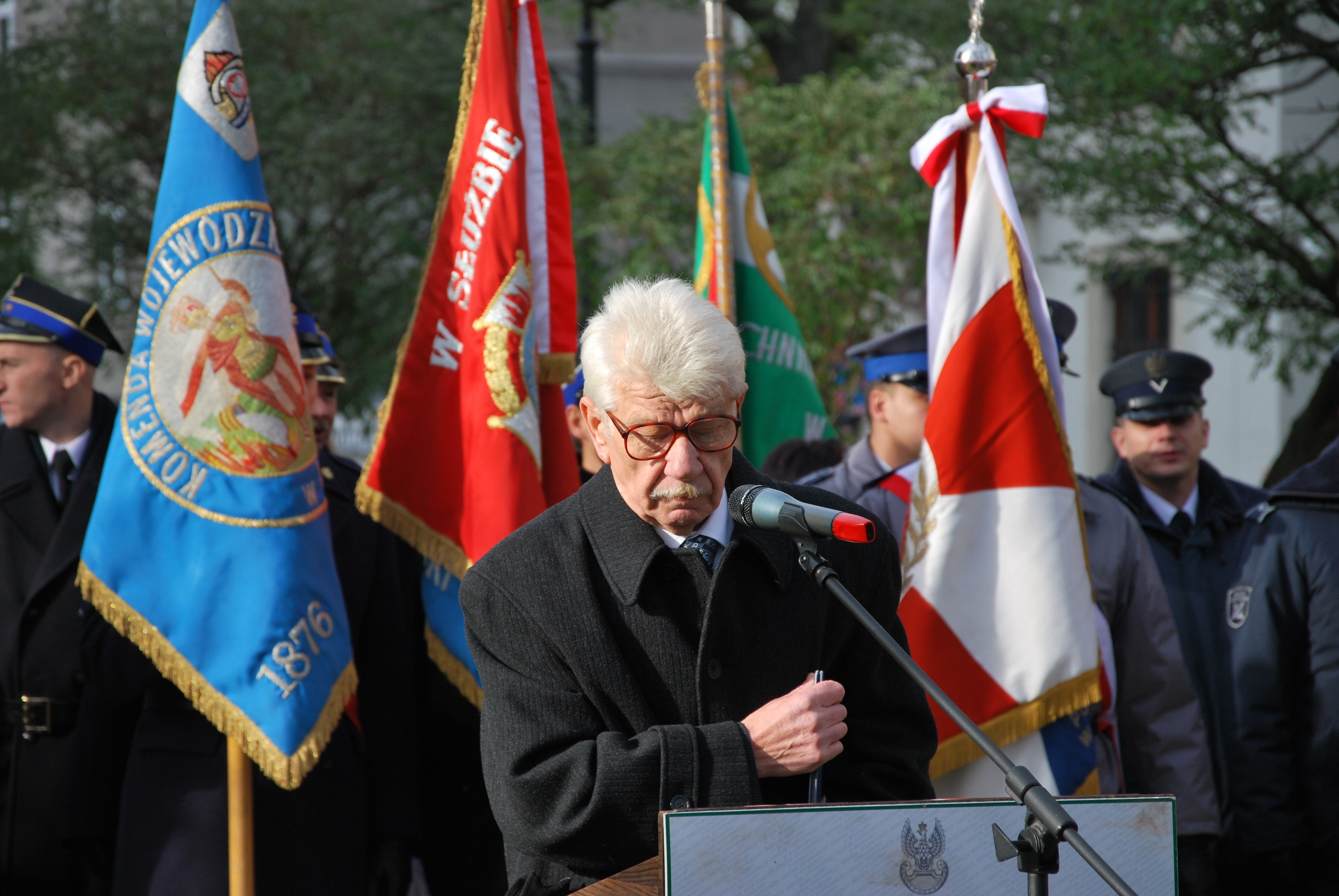
Kruk in 2012

Jan Paweł Kruk (born 2 December 1943, Domaniewice, Poland) is a Polish film and theatre actor.

== Biography ==
He graduated from the National Film School in Łódź in 1966. In the years 1966 to 1969, he was an actor at the Wojciech Bogusławski Theatre in Kalisz, but since 1969, he is on the stage of the Stefan Jaracz Theatre in Łódź.

Kruk has participated in the Fighting Convoy — produced in Murmansk with the participation of Russian and Polish actors — recapturing the Battle of Monte Cassino, which was screened in areas such as London and Monte Cassino itself.
