= Majdan, Gmina Stoczek =

Majdan
- Village
- Location within Poland
- Coordinates: 52°30′N 21°53′E
- Country: Poland
- Voivodeship: Masovian
- County: Węgrów
- Gmina: Stoczek

Majdan (Polish pronunciation: [ˈmajdan]) is a village in the administrative district of Gmina Stoczek, within Węgrów County, Masovian Voivodeship, in east-central Poland.
