= Lasocin, Łódź Voivodeship =

Lasocin
- Village
- Location within Poland
- Coordinates: 52°14′41″N 19°53′38″E
- Country: Poland
- Voivodeship: Łódź
- County: Łowicz
- Gmina: Kiernozia

Lasocin [laˈsɔt͡ɕin] is a village in the administrative district of Gmina Kiernozia, within Łowicz County, Łódź Voivodeship, in central Poland.
