= Battle of Sobota =

1655 battle of the Second Northern War

- Part of the Northern War of 1655–1660 / The Deluge
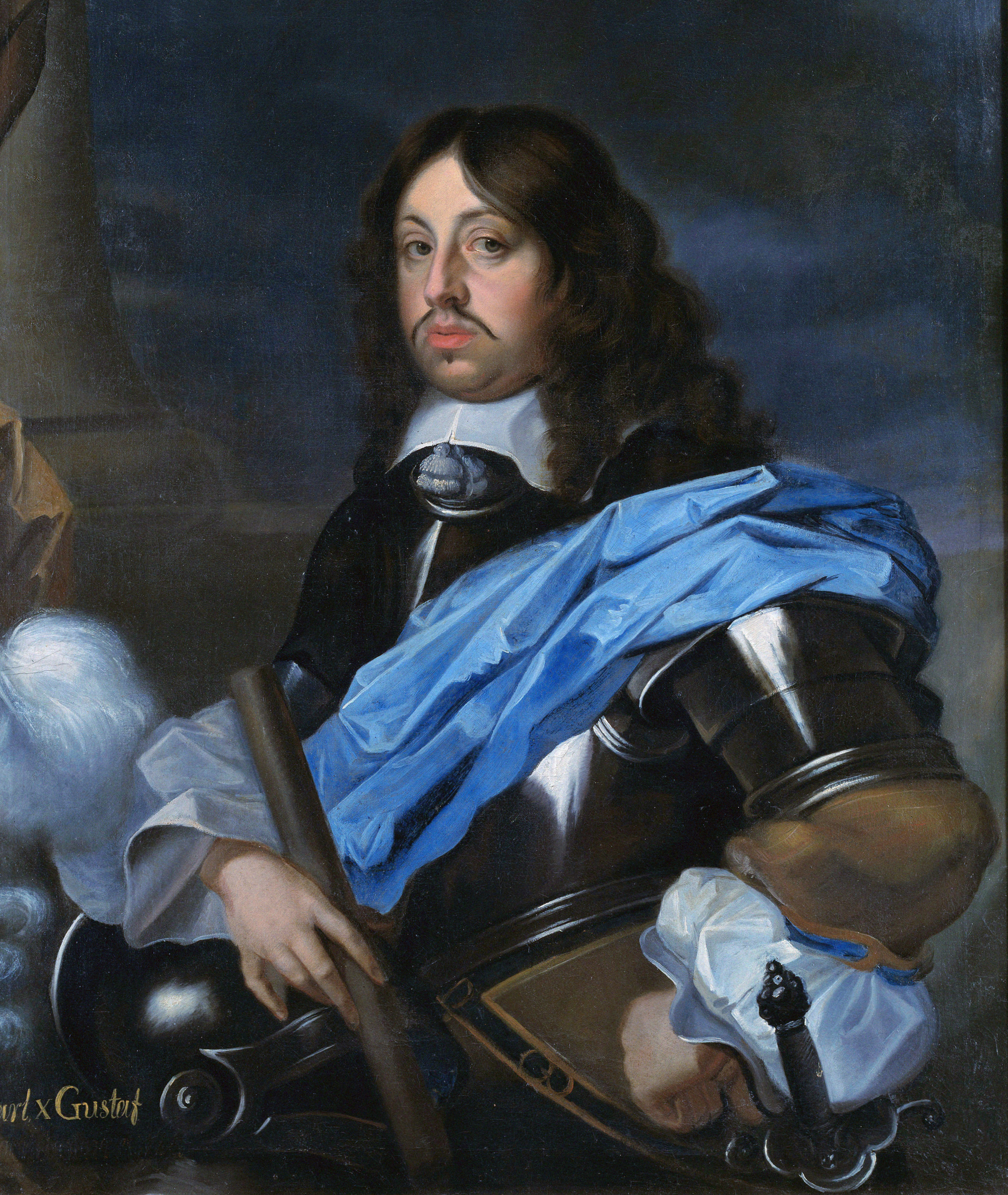
- Karl X Gustav, King of Sweden
Date	23 August 1655
Location	near Sobota
Result	Swedish victory

Belligerents
Swedish Empire	Polish–Lithuanian Commonwealth

Commanders and leaders
(Swedish Empire) Charles X of Sweden (Swedish Empire) Arvid Wittenberg	(Polish–Lithuanian Commonwealth) John II Casimir (Polish–Lithuanian Commonwealth) Aleksander Koniecpolski

Strength
c. 25,000 men	Unknown

The Battle of Sobota took place near Sobota, Poland, on 23 August 1655, between the armies of the Polish–Lithuanian Commonwealth on the one hand and of Sweden on the other.

After Charles X Gustav's entry into Poland, he made camp at Koło. Here the Swedish king received representatives from John II Casimir of Poland in an attempt to sue for peace. The Polish attempts were in vain and the Swedish king marched towards Warsaw. John II Casimir put up a small army in order to hinder the Swedish advance while seeking assistance from other rulers. The forces clashed on 23 August, resulting in a Swedish victory as the Polish forces were routed after rapid, but intense fighting.

After the battle, Charles X Gustav left the majority of his army under the command of field marshal Arvid Wirtenberg von Debern while he himself continued his march towards Warsaw with about 2000 cavalry and 1200 infantry. Warsaw fell with no resistance on 29 August.

== Sources ==
- (in Swedish) Svenskt Militärhistoriskt Bibliotek
- (in Polish) Leszek Podhorodecki, Rapier i koncerz, Warsaw 1985, ISBN 83-05-11452-X, pp. 247–248
