= Brzozów, Łowicz County =

Village in Gmina Bielawy, Poland

Brzozów
- Village
- Location within Poland
- Coordinates: 52°4′23″N 19°37′1″E
- Country: Poland
- Voivodeship: Łódź
- County: Łowicz
- Gmina: Bielawy

Brzozów [ˈbʐɔzuf] is a village in the administrative district of Gmina Bielawy, within Łowicz County, Łódź Voivodeship, in central Poland.
