= Emilianów, Łowicz County =

Emilianów
- Village
- Location within Poland
- Coordinates: 52°5′N 19°34′E
- Country: Poland
- Voivodeship: Łódź
- County: Łowicz
- Gmina: Bielawy

Emilianów [ɛmiˈljanuf] is a village in the administrative district of Gmina Bielawy, within Łowicz County, Łódź Voivodeship, in central Poland.
