= Brzózka, Masovian Voivodeship =

Brzózka
- Village
- Location within Poland
- Coordinates: 52°35′N 21°55′E
- Country: Poland
- Voivodeship: Masovian
- County: Węgrów
- Gmina: Stoczek

Brzózka [ˈbʐuska] is a village in the administrative district of Gmina Stoczek, within Węgrów County, Masovian Voivodeship, in east-central Poland.
