= Przemysłów, Łódź Voivodeship =

Przemysłów
- Village
- Location within Poland
- Coordinates: 52°12′N 19°51′E
- Country: Poland
- Voivodeship: Łódź
- County: Łowicz
- Gmina: Chąśno

Przemysłów [pʂɛˈmɨswuf] is a village in the administrative district of Gmina Chąśno, within Łowicz County, Łódź Voivodeship, in central Poland.
