= Gmina Domaniewice =

Gmina Domaniewice Domaniewice Commune
- Gmina
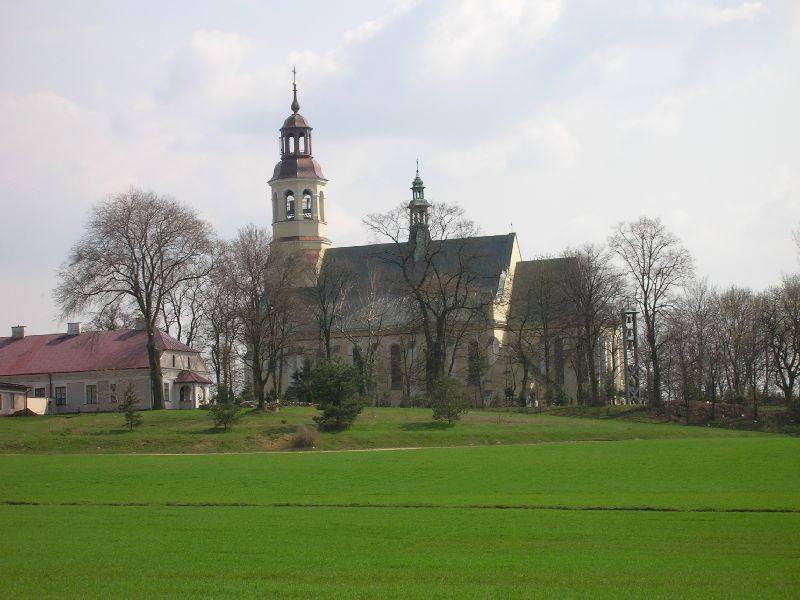

- Coat of arms
- Interactive map of Gmina Domaniewice
- Coordinates (Domaniewice): 52°0′22″N 19°48′9″E
- Country: Poland
- Voivodeship: Łódź
- County: Łowicz
- Seat: Domaniewice

Area
  - Total: 86.23 km^{2} (33.29 sq mi)

Population (2006)
  - Total: 4,594
  - Density: 53.28/km^{2} (138.0/sq mi)
- Time zone: UTC+1 (CET)
  - Summer (DST): UTC+2 (CEST)
- Website: www.domaniewice.pl

Gmina Domaniewice is a rural gmina (administrative district) in Łowicz County, Łódź Voivodeship, in central Poland. Its seat is the village of Domaniewice, which lies approximately 14 kilometres (9 mi) south-west of Łowicz and 34 km (21 mi) north-east of the regional capital Łódź.

The gmina covers an area of 86.23 square kilometres (33.3 sq mi), and as of 2006 its total population is 4,594.

== Villages ==
Gmina Domaniewice contains the villages and settlements of:

- Domaniewice
- Krępa
- Lisiewice Duże
- Lisiewice Małe
- Reczyce
- Rogóźno
- Sapy
- Skaratki
- Skaratki pod Las
- Skaratki pod Rogóźno
- Stroniewice
- Strzebieszew

== Neighbouring gminas ==
Gmina Domaniewice is bordered by the gminas of Bielawy, Głowno, Łowicz and Łyszkowice.
