= Stoczek, Węgrów County =

Stoczek
- Village
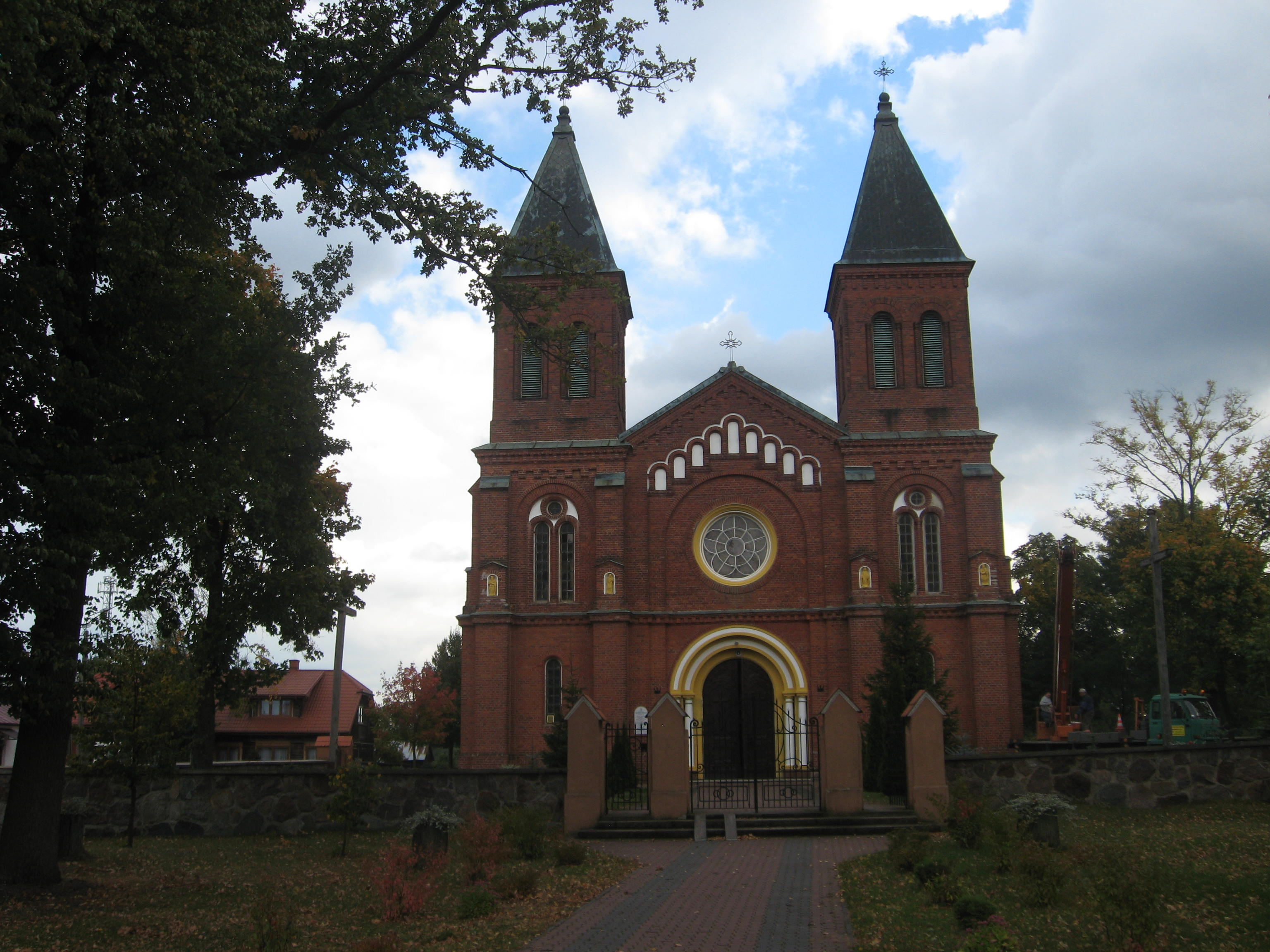
- Church of Saint Stanislaus

- Coat of arms

- Location within Poland
- Coordinates: 52°33′N 21°55′E
- Country: Poland
- Voivodeship: Masovian
- County: Węgrów
- Gmina: Stoczek

Population
  - Total: 890

Stoczek [ˈstɔt͡ʂɛk] is a village in Węgrów County, Masovian Voivodeship, in east-central Poland. It is the seat of the gmina (administrative district) called Gmina Stoczek.
