= Błędów, Łódź Voivodeship =

Błędów
- Village
- Location within Poland
- Coordinates: 52°11′N 19°58′E
- Country: Poland
- Voivodeship: Łódź
- County: Łowicz
- Gmina: Chąśno

Błędów [ˈbwɛnduf] is a village in the administrative district of Gmina Chąśno, within Łowicz County, Łódź Voivodeship, in central Poland.
