= Stare Lipki =

- Village
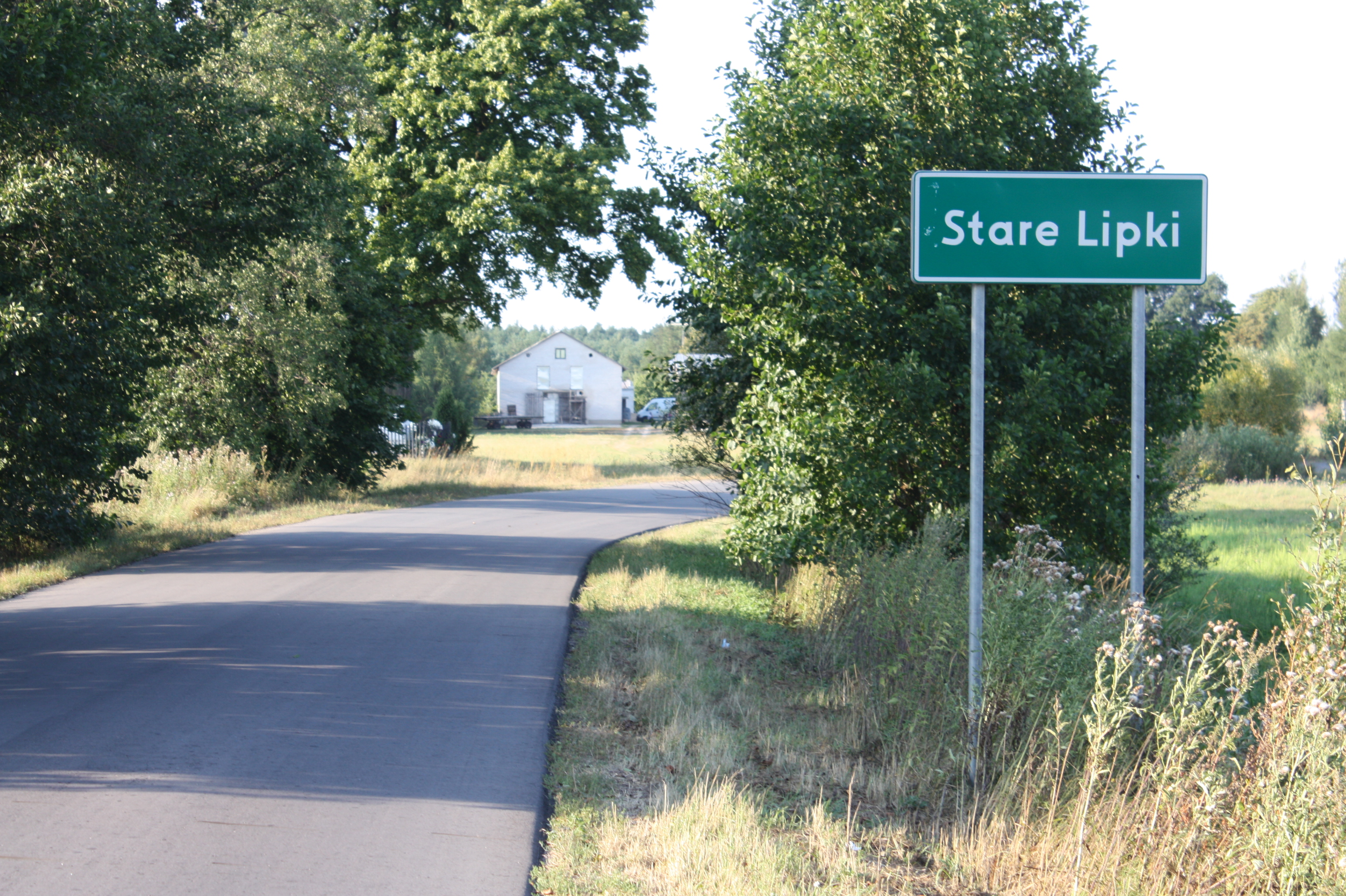

- Location within Poland
- Coordinates: 52°33′N 21°56′E
- Country: Poland
- Voivodeship: Masovian
- County: Węgrów
- Gmina: Stoczek
- Population: 370

Stare Lipki [ˈstarɛ ˈlipki] is a village in the administrative district of Gmina Stoczek, within Węgrów County, Masovian Voivodeship, in east-central Poland.
