= Gmina Kiernozia =

Gmina Kiernozia Kiernozia Commune
- Gmina
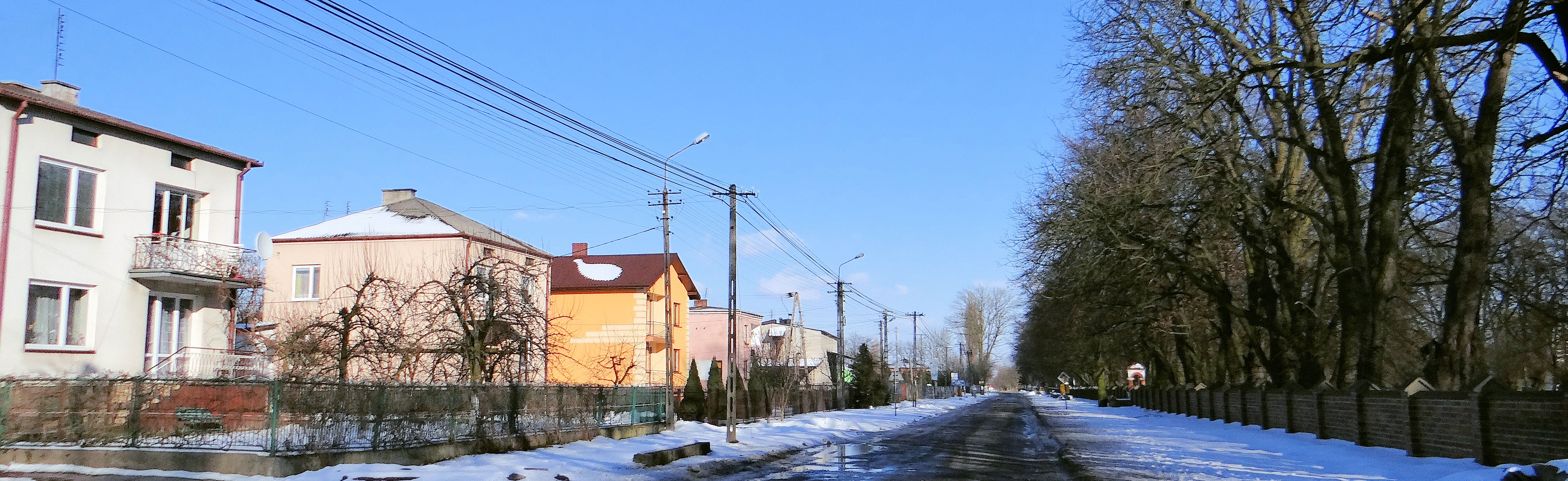
- Interactive map of Gmina Kiernozia
- Coordinates (Kiernozia): 52°16′7″N 19°52′12″E
- Country: Poland
- Voivodeship: Łódź
- County: Łowicz
- Seat: Kiernozia

Area
  - Total: 76.03 km^{2} (29.36 sq mi)

Population (2006)
  - Total: 3,638
  - Density: 47.85/km^{2} (123.9/sq mi)
- Time zone: UTC+1 (CET)
  - Summer (DST): UTC+2 (CEST)
- Website: www.kiernozia.gmina.pl

Gmina Kiernozia is a rural gmina (administrative district) in Łowicz County, Łódź Voivodeship, in central Poland. Its seat is the village of Kiernozia, which lies approximately 20 kilometres (12 mi) north of Łowicz and 61 km (38 mi) north-east of the regional capital Łódź.

The gmina covers an area of 76.03 square kilometres (29.4 sq mi), and as of 2006 its total population is 3,638.

== Villages ==
Gmina Kiernozia contains the villages and settlements of:

- Brodne-Józefów
- Brodne-Towarzystwo
- Chruśle
- Czerniew
- Jadzień
- Jerzewo
- Kiernozia
- Lasocin
- Natolin Kiernoski
- Niedzieliska
- Osiny
- Sokołów-Kolonia
- Sokołów-Towarzystwo
- Stępów
- Teresew
- Tydówka
- Wiśniewo
- Witusza
- Wola Stępowska
- Zamiary

== Neighbouring gminas ==
Gmina Kiernozia is bordered by the gminas of Chąśno, Iłów, Kocierzew Południowy, Pacyna, Sanniki, Zduny and Żychlin.
