= Gmina Chąśno =

Gmina Chąśno Chąśno Commune
- Gmina
- Flag Coat of arms
- Interactive map of Gmina Chąśno
- Coordinates (Chąśno): 52°12′N 19°56′E
- Country: Poland
- Voivodeship: Łódź
- County: Łowicz
- Seat: Chąśno

Area
  - Total: 71.81 km^{2} (27.73 sq mi)

Population (2006)
  - Total: 3,205
  - Density: 44.63/km^{2} (115.6/sq mi)
- Website: www.gminachasno.pl

Gmina Chąśno is a rural gmina (administrative district) in Łowicz County, Łódź Voivodeship, in central Poland. Its seat is the village of Chąśno, which lies approximately 12 kilometres (7 mi) north of Łowicz and 57 km (35 mi) north-east of the regional capital Łódź.

The gmina covers an area of 71.81 square kilometres (27.7 sq mi), and as of 2006 its total population is 3,205.

== Villages ==
Gmina Chąśno contains the villages and settlements of:

- Błędów
- Chąśno
- Goleńsko
- Karnków
- Karsznice Duże
- Karsznice Małe
- Marianka
- Mastki
- Niespusza-Wieś
- Nowa Niespusza
- Przemysłów
- Sierżniki
- Skowroda Północna
- Skowroda Południowa
- Wyborów

== Neighbouring gminas ==
Gmina Chąśno is bordered by the town of Łowicz and by the gminas of Kiernozia, Kocierzew Południowy, Łowicz and Zduny.
