= Gmina Bielawy =

Gmina Bielawy Bielawy Commune
- Gmina
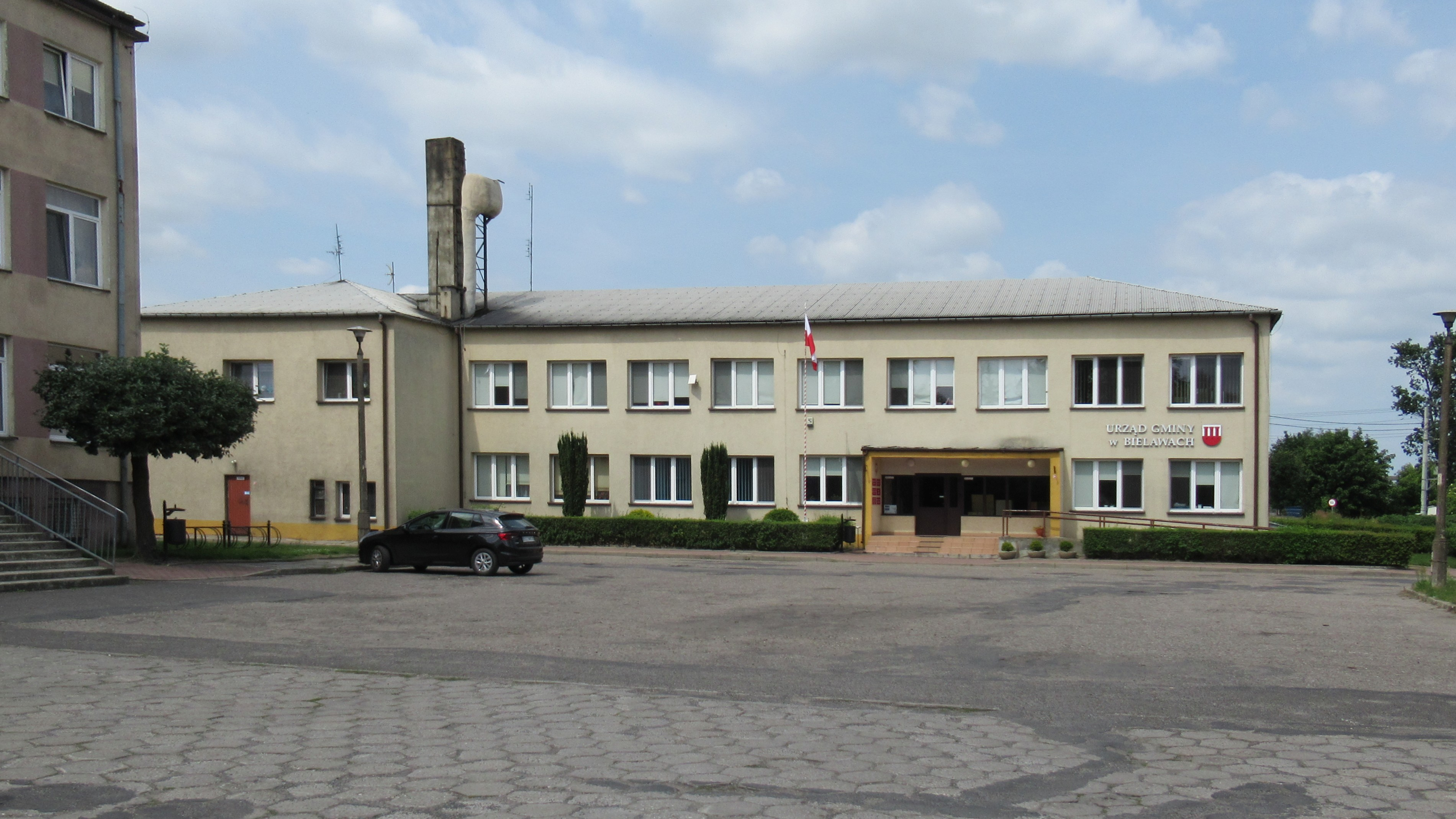
- Municipal hall

- Flag Coat of arms
- Interactive map of Gmina Bielawy
- Coordinates (Bielawy): 52°4′N 19°39′E
- Country: Poland
- Voivodeship: Łódź
- County: Łowicz
- Seat: Bielawy

Area
  - Total: 164.01 km^{2} (63.32 sq mi)

Population (2006)
  - Total: 5,992
  - Density: 36.53/km^{2} (94.62/sq mi)

Gmina Bielawy is a rural gmina (administrative district) in Łowicz County, Łódź Voivodeship, in central Poland. Its seat is the village of Bielawy, which lies approximately 20 kilometres (12 mi) west of Łowicz and 34 km (21 mi) north of the regional capital Łódź.

The gmina covers an area of 164.01 square kilometres (63.3 sq mi), and as of 2006 its total population is 5,992.

== Villages ==
Gmina Bielawy contains the villages and settlements of:

- Bielawska Wieś
- Bielawy
- Bogumin
- Borów
- Borówek
- Brzozów
- Chruślin
- Drogusza
- Emilianów
- Gaj
- Gosławice
- Helin
- Janinów
- Łazin
- Leśniczówka
- Marianów
- Marywil
- Oszkowice
- Piaski Bankowe
- Piotrowice
- Przezwiska
- Psary
- Rulice
- Seligi
- Skubiki
- Sobocka Wieś
- Sobota
- Stare Orenice
- Stare Piaski
- Stary Waliszew
- Traby
- Trzaskowice
- Walewice
- Waliszew Dworski
- Wojewodza
- Wola Gosławska
- Zakrzew
- Żdżary
- Zgoda

== Neighbouring gminas ==
Gmina Bielawy is bordered by the gminas of Bedlno, Domaniewice, Głowno, Łowicz, Piątek and Zduny.
