= Gajówka Zachodnia =

Village in Gmina Stoczek, Poland

- Village
- Location within Poland
- Coordinates: 52°33′21″N 21°52′02″E
- Country: Poland
- Voivodeship: Masovian
- County: Węgrów
- Gmina: Stoczek

Gajówka Zachodnia [ɡaˈjufka zaˈxɔdɲa] is a village in the administrative district of Gmina Stoczek, within Węgrów County, Masovian Voivodeship, in east-central Poland.
