= Chąśno =

- Village
- Location within Poland
- Coordinates: 52°12′N 19°56′E
- Country: Poland
- Voivodeship: Łódź
- County: Łowicz
- Gmina: Chąśno

Chąśno [ˈxɔ̃ɕnɔ] is a village in Łowicz County, Łódź Voivodeship, in central Poland. It is the seat of the gmina (administrative district) called Gmina Chąśno.
