= Marianów, Łowicz County =

Marianów
- Village
- Location within Poland
- Coordinates: 52°2′53″N 19°39′50″E
- Country: Poland
- Voivodeship: Łódź
- County: Łowicz
- Gmina: Bielawy

Marianów [maˈrjanuf] is a village in the administrative district of Gmina Bielawy, within Łowicz County, Łódź Voivodeship, in central Poland.
