= Borówek, Łódź Voivodeship =

Borówek
- Village
- Location within Poland
- Coordinates: 52°6′N 19°36′E
- Country: Poland
- Voivodeship: Łódź
- County: Łowicz
- Gmina: Bielawy

Borówek [bɔˈruvɛk] is a village in the administrative district of Gmina Bielawy, within Łowicz County, Łódź Voivodeship, in central Poland.
