= Topór, Węgrów County =

Topór
- Village
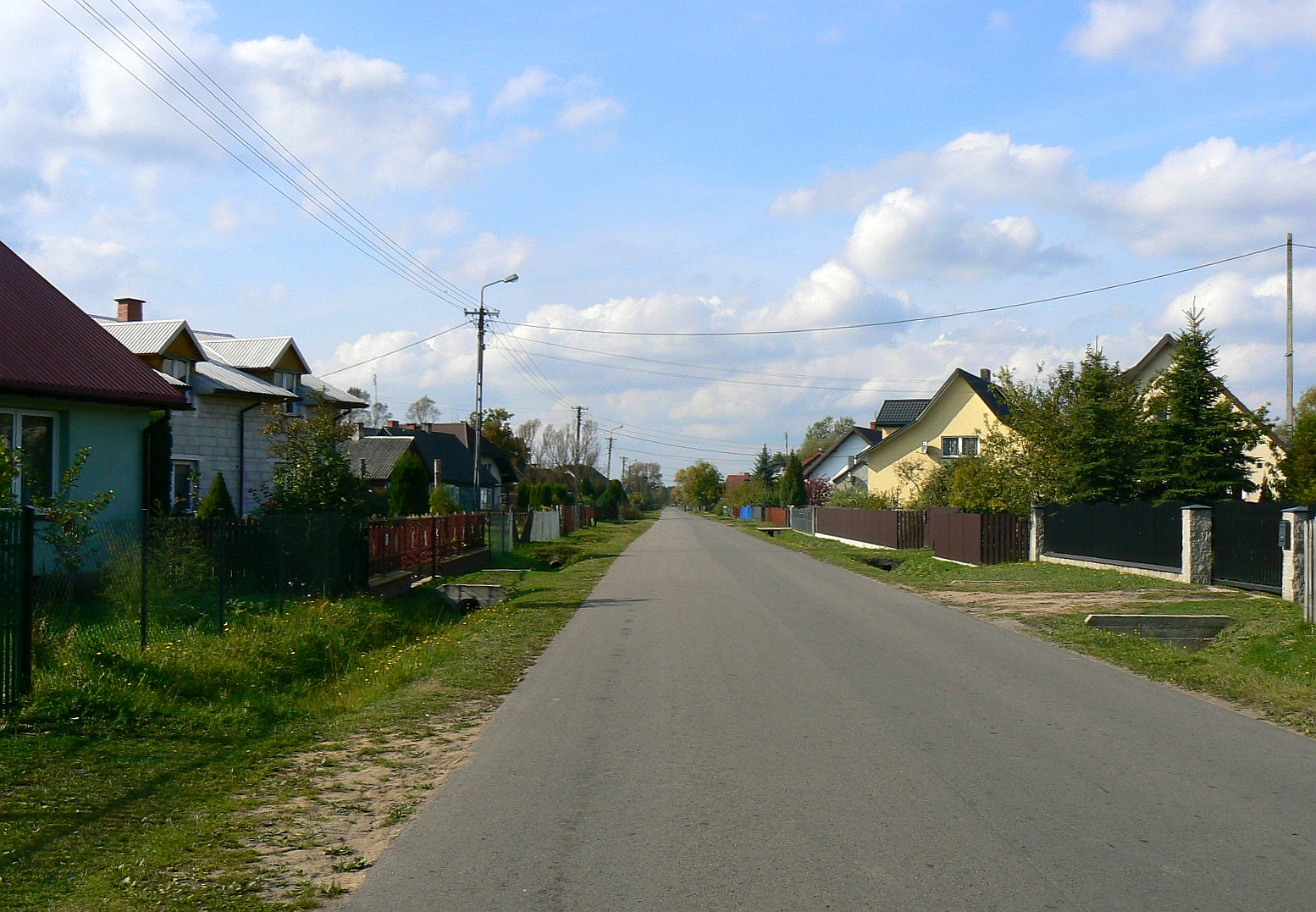

- Location within Poland
- Coordinates: 52°34′N 21°50′E
- Country: Poland
- Voivodeship: Masovian
- County: Węgrów
- Gmina: Stoczek

Topór [ˈtɔpur] is a village in the administrative district of Gmina Stoczek, within Węgrów County, Masovian Voivodeship, in east-central Poland.
