= Kalaty =

- Village
- Location within Poland
- Coordinates: 52°30′12″N 21°51′10″E
- Country: Poland
- Voivodeship: Masovian
- County: Węgrów
- Gmina: Stoczek

Kalaty [kaˈlatɨ] is a village in the administrative district of Gmina Stoczek, within Węgrów County, Masovian Voivodeship, in east-central Poland.
