= Zakrzew, Łowicz County =

Zakrzew
- Village
- Location within Poland
- Coordinates: 52°8′N 19°40′E
- Country: Poland
- Voivodeship: Łódź
- County: Łowicz
- Gmina: Bielawy

Zakrzew [ˈzakʂɛf] is a village in the administrative district of Gmina Bielawy, within Łowicz County, Łódź Voivodeship, in central Poland.
