= Leśniczówka, Łódź Voivodeship =

Leśniczówka
- Village
- Location within Poland
- Coordinates: 52°07′54″N 19°42′20″E
- Country: Poland
- Voivodeship: Łódź
- County: Łowicz
- Gmina: Bielawy

Leśniczówka (Polish pronunciation: [lɛɕɲiˈtʂufka]) is a village in the administrative district of Gmina Bielawy, within Łowicz County, Łódź Voivodeship, in central Poland.
