= Domaniewice, Łódź Voivodeship =

Domaniewice
- Village
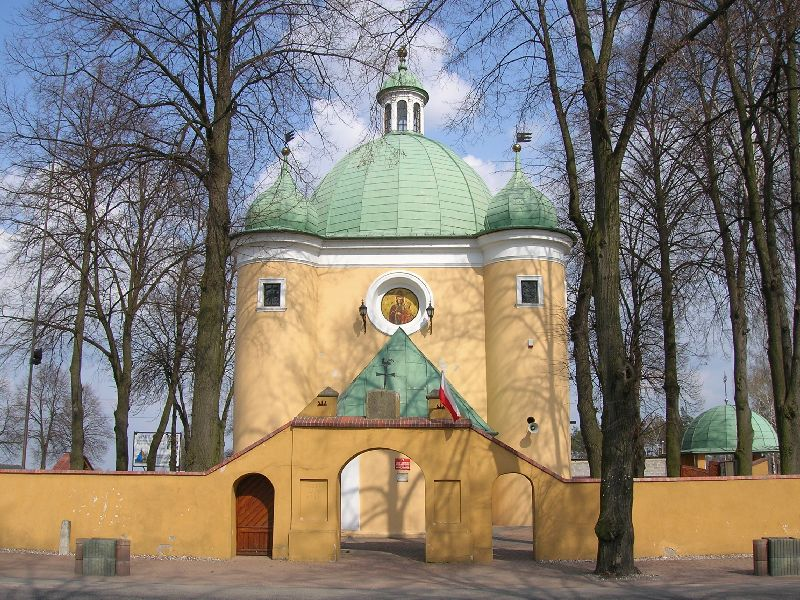
- Baroque Chapel of the Nativity of the Virgin Mary in Domaniewice

- Location within Poland
- Coordinates: 52°0′22″N 19°48′9″E
- Country: Poland
- Voivodeship: Łódź
- County: Łowicz
- Gmina: Domaniewice
- Population: 906
- Time zone: UTC+1 (CET)
  - Summer (DST): UTC+2 (CEST)
- Vehicle registration: ELC
- Website: http://www.domaniewice.pl/

Domaniewice [dɔmaɲɛˈvit͡sɛ] is a village in Łowicz County, Łódź Voivodeship, in central Poland. It is the seat of the gmina (administrative district) called Gmina Domaniewice.

== History ==
Domaniewice was a private church village of the Roman Catholic Archdiocese of Gniezno, administratively located in the Rawa Voivodeship in the Greater Poland Province of the Polish Crown.

Following the joint German-Soviet invasion of Poland, which started World War II in September 1939, the village was occupied by Germany until 1945. In August 1944, during the Warsaw Uprising, the Germans deported 3,000 Varsovians from the Dulag 121 camp in Pruszków, where they were initially imprisoned, to Domaniewice. Those Poles were mainly old people, ill people and women with children.

== Sports ==
The local football club is LZS Vagat Domaniewice. It competes in the lower leagues.

== Notable people ==
- Jan Paweł Kruk (born 1943), film and theatre actor
