= Kazimierzów, Gmina Stoczek =

Kazimierzów
- Village
- Location within Poland
- Coordinates: 52°29′19″N 21°57′42″E
- Country: Poland
- Voivodeship: Masovian
- County: Węgrów
- Gmina: Stoczek
- Population: 40

Kazimierzów [kaʑiˈmjɛʐuf] is a village in the administrative district of Gmina Stoczek, within Węgrów County, Masovian Voivodeship, in east-central Poland.
