= Marianów, Węgrów County =

Marianów
- Village
- Location within Poland
- Coordinates: 52°31′52″N 21°49′44″E
- Country: Poland
- Voivodeship: Masovian
- County: Węgrów
- Gmina: Stoczek

Marianów [maˈrjanuf] is a village in the administrative district of Gmina Stoczek, within Węgrów County, Masovian Voivodeship, in east-central Poland.
