= Zhulin (surname) =

Zhulin (Russian: Жулин, masculine) or Zhulina (Жулинa, feminine) is a Russian surname that may refer to

- Alexander Zhulin (born 1963), Russian ice dancing coach and former competitor
- Deniss Žuļins (Denis Zhulin, born 1982), Latvian weightlifter
- Valentina Zhulina (born 1953), Soviet rower

== See also ==
- Zhilin (disambiguation)
