= Kozołupy =

- Village
- Location within Poland
- Coordinates: 52°31′N 21°58′E
- Country: Poland
- Voivodeship: Masovian
- County: Węgrów
- Gmina: Stoczek

Kozołupy [kɔzɔˈwupɨ] is a village in the administrative district of Gmina Stoczek, within Węgrów County, Masovian Voivodeship, in east-central Poland.
