= Stary Waliszew =

- Village
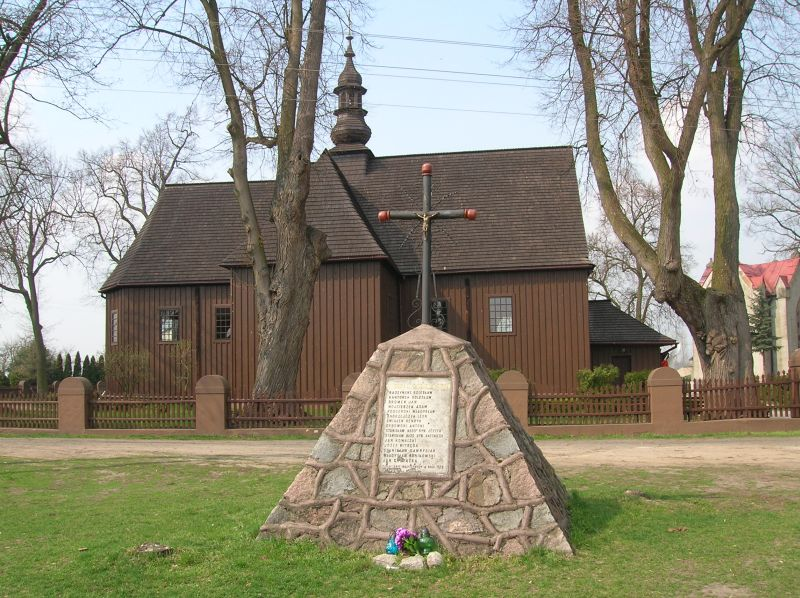
- Wooden church

- Location within Poland
- Coordinates: 52°2′11″N 19°38′6″E
- Country: Poland
- Voivodeship: Łódź
- County: Łowicz
- Gmina: Bielawy

Stary Waliszew [ˈstarɨ vaˈliʂɛf] is a village in the administrative district of Gmina Bielawy, within Łowicz County, Łódź Voivodeship, in central Poland.
