= Zhu Lin =

Zhu Lin may refer to:

- Zhu Lin (official), circuit intendant of Shanghai under the Qing
- Zhu Lin (politician) (born 1933), wife of former Chinese Premier Li Peng
- Zhu Lin (actress) (born 1952), Chinese film actress
- Zhu Lin (novelist) (born 1949), Chinese novelist
- Zhu Lin (badminton) (born 1984), Chinese badminton player
- Zhu Lin (tennis) (born 1994), Chinese tennis player
