= Łowicz County =

Łowicz County Powiat łowicki
- County
- Flag Coat of arms

- Location within the voivodeship
- Coordinates (Łowicz): 52°6′N 19°56′E
- Country: Poland
- Voivodeship: Łódź
- Seat: Łowicz
- Gminas: Total 10 (incl. 1 urban): Łowicz; Gmina Bielawy; Gmina Chąśno; Gmina Domaniewice; Gmina Kiernozia; Gmina Kocierzew Południowy; Gmina Łowicz; Gmina Łyszkowice; Gmina Nieborów; Gmina Zduny

Area
  - Total: 987.13 km^{2} (381.13 sq mi)

Population (2006)
  - Total: 82,338
  - Density: 83.412/km^{2} (216.03/sq mi)
  - Urban: 30,204
  - Rural: 52,134
- Car plates: ELC
- Website: www.powiat.lowicz.pl

Łowicz County (Polish: powiat łowicki) is a unit of territorial administration and local government (powiat) in Łódź Voivodeship, central Poland. It came into being on January 1, 1999 as a result of the Polish local government reforms passed in 1998. Its administrative seat and only town is Łowicz, which lies 48 kilometres (30 mi) north-east of the regional capital Łódź.

The county covers an area of 987.13 square kilometres (381.1 sq mi). As of 2006, its total population was 82,338, out of which the population of Łowicz was 30,204, and the rural population was 52,134.

== Neighbouring counties ==
Łowicz County is bordered by Sochaczew County to the north-east, Skierniewice County to the south-east, Brzeziny County to the south, Zgierz County to the south-west, Łęczyca County and Kutno County to the west, and Gostynin County to the north-west.

== Administrative divisions ==
The county is subdivided into 10 gminas (one urban and nine rural). These are listed in the following table, in descending order of population.

Gmina	Type	Area (km^{2})	Population (2006)	Seat
Łowicz	urban	23.4	30,204	
Gmina Nieborów	rural	103.3	9,536	Nieborów
Gmina Łowicz	rural	133.4	7,444	Łowicz *
Gmina Łyszkowice	rural	106.9	6,931	Łyszkowice
Gmina Zduny	rural	128.5	6,098	Zduny
Gmina Bielawy	rural	164.0	5,992	Bielawy
Gmina Kocierzew Południowy	rural	93.5	4,696	Kocierzew Południowy
Gmina Domaniewice	rural	86.2	4,594	Domaniewice
Gmina Kiernozia	rural	76.0	3,638	Kiernozia
Gmina Chąśno	rural	71.8	3,205	Chąśno
* seat not part of the gmina
