= Łowicz dialect =

Dialect of Polish spoken in the historical Duchy of Łowicz

- Księżak dialect
- Native to: Poland
- Region: Duchy of Łowicz
- Ethnicity: Łowiczans (Księżaks)
- Language family: Indo-European: Balto-Slavic; Slavic; West Slavic; Lechitic; Polish; Masovian; Łowicz dialect

Language codes
- ISO 639-3: –
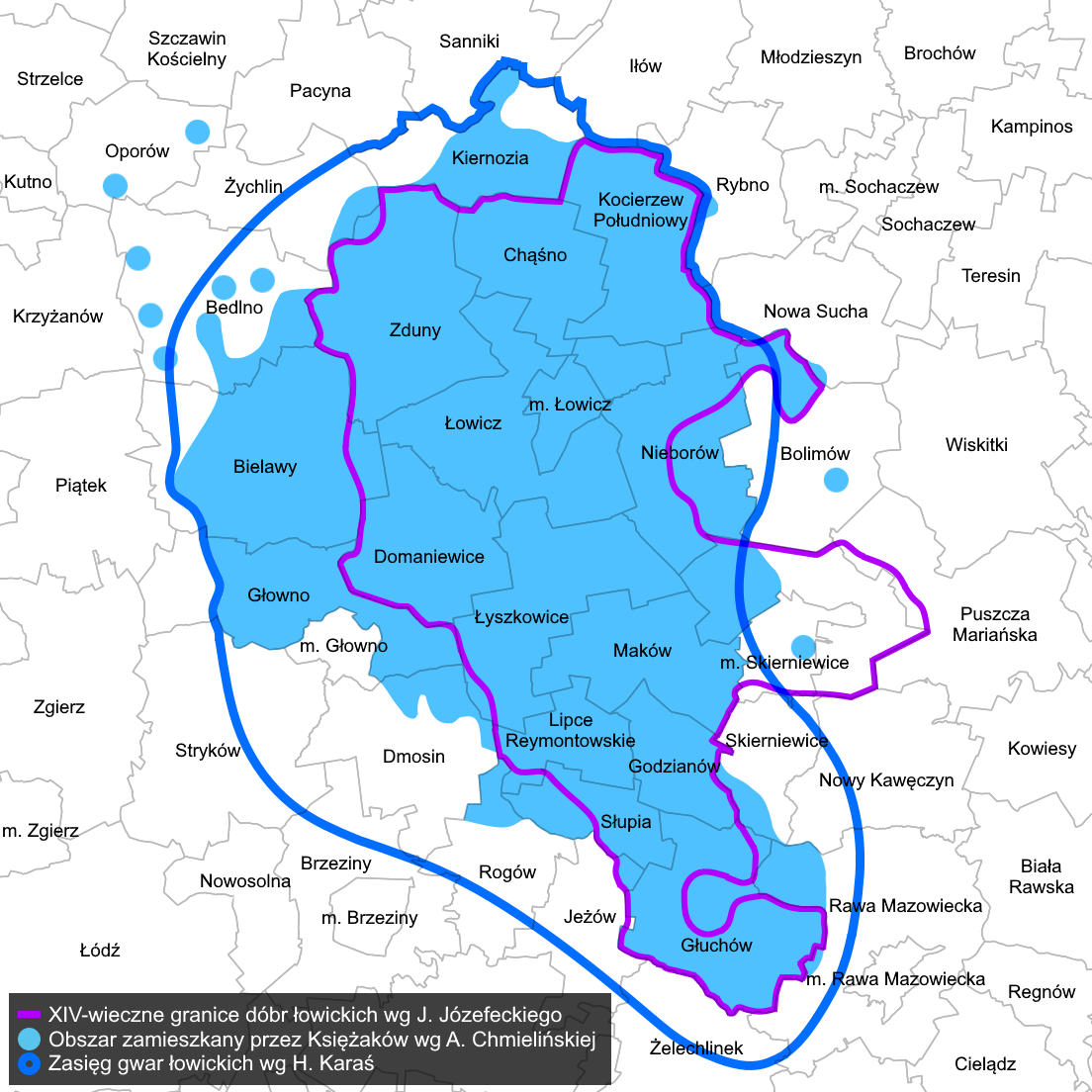
- Area of the historical Duchy of Łowicz, Księżak people and dialect

The Łowicz dialect or the Księżak dialect is a dialect of Polish spoken by the ethnographic group of Łowiczans (Księżaks) inhabiting the historical region known as the Duchy of Łowicz around the cities of Łowicz and Skierniewice in south-western Masovia. It belongs to the Masovian dialect group and borders the Near Mazovian dialect to the north and east, the Lesser Polish Masovian Borderland dialect to the southeast, and the Łęczyca dialect to the south and west.

The classification of the Łowicz dialect is debated; in the past it has been considered a Lesser Polish dialect, but there are many features placing it within the Masovian group – the Łowicz dialect shows many transitional features between Masovia, Lesser Poland and Greater Poland. Currently, the dialect is often considered a trasitional dialect.

1. Features shared with Masovian dialects:
  1. ra- re-: redlić, redzić
  2. ja- > je-: jerzmo, jerzyny
  3. Leveling of pretent tense jedzie to jadzie
  4. 'a > 'e: spowiedać, wietrok, zamietać
  5. Simplification of consonant clusters after decomposing soft labial consonants by a reduction of the spirant:
    1. In the words ćwartka, śwat, śwatło, świerk, śwynia
    2. In the nominal instrumental plural ending: cepamy
    3. In instrumental plural endings of adjectives and pronouns: z nimy, z tymy dobrymu
    4. In enclitic pronominal forms: boli mi, dej my
  6. Leveling of nominative and genitive stems of neuter nouns: ciemię-ciemia siemię-siemia
  7. Contamination of the dative singular endings -owi + -u > -owju > -oju: chłopokoju
  8. Use of the third person plural past formsleli, sieli, śmieli sie based on mieli
  9. Replacement of neuter -ę nouns denoting young animals with -ątko: gynsiontko, koźlontko, kurconko or
  10. Replacement of neuter -ę nouns denoting young animals with -ak: cielok, koźlok, kurcok
  11. The comparative form cinzejsy (standard cięższy)
  12. Replacement of the infinitive ending -eć with -ić//-yć: lezyć, siedzić, wyjrzyć, zajrzyć, zlecić
  13. Use of the iterative suffix -ywać: zajmywać, znajdywać
  14. Lack of the morphemes -ow-, -yw- in kupać, zjmać, zlotać
2. Features shared with Lesser Polish dialects
  1. A change of slanted á to o: bijok, bratowo, luśnio, do nos, zycio
  2. A merging of slanted é with e: bieda, brzeg, mleko
  3. Replacement of ablauted 'o with 'e: biedro, mietła, niese, piełun, pierun, wiesna
  4. A change of i, y > e before liquids:
    1. iN > eN: jendyk, jenny
    2. yN > eN: z tem, z temi dobremi
    3. iL > eL: lelijo, pieła, sielny
    4. iR > eR: drugie roz, fieranka
    5. yL > eL: beł, kobelła, motel
    6. yR > eRL derechtur
  5. Lowering of uN to oN: gront
  6. A tendency to harden labial consonants in conjugation (first person singular present): grzebe, kope
  7. Dissimilation of the clusters:
    1. tw > kw: kwardy
    2. tch > ćch: ćchórz
    3. tw > cw: cwaróg, łacwo
  8. Reduplication of s, ś > ss, śś in the terms bosso, wiesso sie, wiśsi and potential further dissimilation to sc, ść in bosco, powieścić, wiści (wisi)
  9. Dissimilation of the clusters:
    1. chw > kw: kwast, kwila, pokwoluny, zukwały
    2. chrz> krz: krzan, krzciny, krześniok, śpikrz
    3. rzch > rzk: wierzk
    4. kt > cht: chto, dochtur, ducht, dyrechtur, tracht
    5. k > ch: chłopotać sie, łocchnąć się
  10. Assimilation of kk > tk in letki, mintki (miękki)
  11. Use of the old dual ending -wa in the imperative: nieśwa, piswa, zawieźwa
  12. Replacement of -wa- with -ja- in dajać, wstajać
  13. Change of the prefix roz- > ôz-: ôzporek, na ôzgun, ôzwora
3. Features shared with Greater Polish dialects
  1. Decomposition of ą
    1. Finally: jadom
    2. Medially before plosives: chomonto, gołomb
  2. Decomposition of ę
    1. Medially before a plosive: gołymbia, pynto, zymby
  3. Replacement of labial w with labial b in brzodziana, grzyba, knubie, trzeźby
  4. Change of rnk > rk: ziorko (ziarnko)
  5. Diminutive forms such as gornysek, kamysek, promysek, słunysko (słoneczko)
  6. Use of the adjectival endings -ity (barcyty, wodnity) and -aty (kolcaty, liściaty, pasiaty)
  7. The adverbial comparative forms -i||-y: nizy (niżej), późni, wyzy.
4. Features shared with both Masovian and Lesser Polish dialects
  1. Masuration
  2. Use of -wa in
    1. The First person plural present: jedziewa
    2. First person plural past: nieśliśwa
    3. First person plural imperative: napiswa
  3. Use of the adjectival endings -isty (barcysty, piacysty, wodnisty) and -asty (gliniasty, graniasty, jiglasty)
5. Features shared with both Lesser Polish and Greater Polish dialects
  1. A change of the imperative -aj > -ej: cytej
  2. Secondary e in the prepositions w, z: we wodzie, ze sokiem
  3. Labialization of initial o- > ô-: ôbora, ôko, ôwiec
  4. Secondary nasalization not motivated by a nasl consonant: gorsynt, myntryka, tompola, warząchew
  5. Voicing of c to dz in the comparative of adverbs: kródzy (krócej)
  6. Partial or complete reduction of medial ł ending a consonant cluster: kunica (kłonica), mynorz (młynarz)
  7. Interterm voicing: brad matki (brat matki), laz rośnie (las rośnie)
  8. Assimilation and simplification of strz, zdrz, trz, drz: oszcze (ostrze), nożdża (nozdrza), szczała (strzała)
  9. A change of rs to sz: gasztka (garstka), napasztek (naparstek)
  10. Retention of -i in numeral declension for the numerals 5-10: piuńci, szóści, siódmi
  11. The use of the suffix -ąckę in the deverbal adverb na stojąckę motivated by the government of the preposition na and resulting from the combination of the suffixes -ący with -ka, -kę, -ki
  12. Occurrence of the forms dońdę (dojdę), póńdę (pójdę)

== Phonology ==
Typical of Greater Polish as well as Lesser Polish dialects, voicing of word-final consonants before vowels and liquids is present here, including before clitics: jag jyno, mugeś (mogłeś). Some villages show devoicing under influence from Standard Polish. Typical of Masovian and Lesser Polish dialects is the presence of mazuration with very few exceptions,; this process is being undone for many speakers, however forms with mazuration are still dominant.

=== Vowels ===
The change of initial ja-, ra- to je-, re-, still can be found in a few words: redzić (radzić).

Clear a sees its reflect as a, but the cluster -aj changes to -ej, except in the south-east, where aj changes to oj. This occurs most often in the imperative of verbs: dawejcie or in adverbial forms: dzisiej, wcorej, but south-east dzisioj, wcoroj. The nominal derivational suffix -aj generally changes to -oj or is kept as -aj. The change of ra- > re- is kept only in a few words: poredzić, redzić, redło, redlina, redlić, redlicka, rymie (standard ramię); other individual cases of this change are attested: taterok||tatarok, laterka||latarnio. The change of ja- > je- is exceedingly exceptional, seen in jerzymko (standard jarzemko), or jerzmo, przyjeciułka. Clear aN (with a nasal) remains unchanged in the whole region: kamiń, as well as in grammatical forms: zabrany, kijamy (standard kijami); the suffix -anin is reduces to -an: miescan (standard mieszczanin).

The adverbs teraz, zaraz, chociaż, and nazad are realized as tero, zaro, chocioż, nazod.

Clear e generally corresponds with e.

Ablaut of e:o is missing in the words biedra, ûbier, zbier, piełón, pierón, Pietrz (regionally), piesnecki, mietła, pumietło, rzemiesło, wiesna, zwiesna, wietki, and wiesło; regionally zaciesane, Brzezoski; ablaut is present where it is missing in standard Polish in the words zyniaty (Standard Polish żonaty) siestrzyn. This is often the result of leveling: biere||bieróm, niese||niesóm, wynies (standard wyniósł), plete||pletóm||upletła, gniete, wywiezły, oblek. The terms źróbka (pronounced as źrubka), ziobro, Ziebroski||Ziobroski, ziomka (standard ziemia), kloryk (standard kleryk), fajorki(||fajery), and arkusiorka show ablaut where it is absent in standard Polish. Ablaut can also be absent in the virile plural of passive adjectival participles via leveling to non-virile forms: napasuni (< napasóni). Soft 'e does not always show ablaut to 'a: wietrok||wiatrz, powiedać||powiadać, piesynka, piesnecka, nopletace, or 'a might not ablaut with 'e: bladsy, bladziyńki, bladziutki; po ciaście, lascyna, sianny (standard sienny). A change of 'e > 'o is absent in the words ôsieł, kozieł, kocieł.

The surname suffix -'owski and the toponym suffix -'ów are realized as -'ewski and -'ew; that is -e- is retained after soft consonants. The masculine dative singular ending -eji/-ewi can occur in both hard and soft stem nouns everywhere except in the north-east.

Mobile e can appear in some consonant clusters: wiater, meter||metra (standard metr), or can become non-mobile in others: bes||besu (standard bez||bzu), dech||dechu (standard dech||tchu).

The cluster ej can raise in some words: ôlijander, klijeł, Macijeski, lecki (standard lejce). The infinitive ending -eć raises via leveling to -yć, -ić.

Similarly, or and ol can change to ur and ul but alternate with o: dochtur.

The high vowel u usually remains unchanged.

i, y change to e before r, l, ł: fieranka, derechtur, bielet, belica, mogieła, zmełka. This process also occurs in newer loanwords: pastelka. Exceptions to this change occur: wilk. The past tense of -ić/-yć verbs shows -el-, -eł- due to the same sound change (chodzieł, połozeła), except in Skierniewice County and neighboring regions, where in the masculine singular they take the ending -uł loaned from neighbouring, non-Księżak dialects. This ending can be seen especially if ł is realized as /w/.

The ending -ej raises to -y, -'i: blizy, ładni, wiyncy. This happens in the genitive-dative-locative feminine singular of adjectival declension.

In some words and in the imperative, the realization -ij keeps -j under influence of other cases and the present tense.

Latinate -yja/-ija words do not contract: Francyja||Francyjo.

==== Slanted vowels ====
Slanted á generally merges with o, but Halina Karaś notes that it is occasionally retained as á or sometimes merges with a due to influence from standard Polish; historically diphthongal /ɔu/ could be heard amongst some older women in the early 20th century, but generally o was and is much more common, and this diphthong amongst its users occurred only in open syllables. This o resulting from slanted á was sometimes prelabialized: môtoku ([mwɔtɔku], but the cluster -au- often diphthongizes to /ɔw/ noumyśnie ([nɔ͡umɘɕɲɛ])/noumyśle ([nɔ͡umɘɕlɛ]). This o resulting from á can appear in the stems of nouns: bol (standard bal), before tautosyllabic voiced consonants: dziod||dziada, bobka (standard babka).

The archaic genitive plural ending -∅ can cause slanting: lot||lata, dotychcos (standard dotychczas)||cas (standard czas).

The suffix -aj is realized as -oj: ûrodzoj||ûrodzoju, zwycoj||zwycoju, but can sometimes alternate with -a-: Gałoj||gałąja, Machoj||Machaja.

The suffixes/word-final clusters -ak, -as, -aszek, -al, -ar, -acz are realized as -ok, -os, -osek, -ol, -orz, -or (which sometimes alternates with -ar-, e.g. towor||toworu or towary), and -oc (rarely as . -ac) respectively. The adjectival ending -arski does not show slanting and is kept as -arski.

This o from á can be seen also in the nominative feminine singular of soft-stem nouns: groblo, but a can also be seen here; the suffix -nia is always realized as -nio but Latinate -yja/-ija nouns show fluctuation between -yjo/-ijo and -yja/-ija.

Neuter -ie gerunds take -o < -á in the genitive singular: godanio, and the nominative feminine singular of adjectives take -o: dzielno (standard dzielna).

Contracted verbs show o < á (in turn < Proto-Slavic *VjV): grzoć sie, loć, sioć, śmioć sie, wioć; or can also appear not as the result of contraction: bocyć/bôcyć (standard baczyć).

-am/-asz verbs show o: godos; broł (next to brała), but younger people show clear a in the masculine past sometimes: poprzedajał, widział. The imperative shows -oj in the south-east; the imperative dej is common everywhere.

The derivational prefix na- is often realized as no-: nocelnik, nolezy sie, but -a- can be seen" nawijać, naleźć/naliźć, similarly za- is often realized as zo-: zogun, but zopumoga next to zapoumoga.

The preposition za and zza is usually realized with clear a. The preposition dla can be realized as dla, dlo, or lo.

Some personal pronoun forms show o: jo, nos, wos, but ja and nas also occur.

Numerals formed with -naście or -nasty generally show -o-: jedynoście, jedynosty.

The superlative of adjectives and adverbs is realized with either noj- or no-, but villages near cities show naj-: nojmłotsy, notańsy next to suburban najładniejse, najlepso.

Slanted é generally merges with clear e, a characteristic trait of the dialect: grzech (< grzéch). The vowels y and i can also even lower to e: cheba, korzestać, resunek, but exceptions occur. In Skierniewice County and neighboring regions, clear e can be heard, especially in the southern parts of the region (around Słupia and Janisławice). Normal e can be seen in adjectival declension replacing historic é, but reflexes é can also be seen, but slanted é can also merge with y, i.

Slanted ó has merged with u: bur: muj: sul.

==== Nasal vowels ====
The clusters áN and ą raise to óN except middle-aged women and small children in Strugienice, Wierznowice, and Maurzyce, who raise these to uN people. This ó can alternate with a: pón||pana. -am, -asz verbs show similar raising in the first person endings: cytóm, cytómy The personal pronoun forms nam, wam raise to nóm, wóm, but regionally can be realized as nam, wam. The prefix/preposition za(-) can raise to zo(-) prenasally as well: zomek, zo nos. The preposition dla can be realized as lu, ló before nasals: lu mnie, ló nos.

The cluster eN in all contexts raises, the degree of which depends; men that are often in the city or who read newspapers raise this cluster very little; 70-80-year-olds and people in suburban villages raise this to éN; elsewhere this can raise from yN to iN (or in between), especially after a palatal consonant. The masculine-neuter instrumental nominal ending, masculine-neuter nominative-locative adjectival ending and first person plural past ending are -ym/-im/-ém due to raising: ładnym; złodziejym; jagzym beł nieduzym chłopokiym. This of eN and yN can occur in the feminine via analogy: takiém fartuchém, but also zmarłém dusóm. The masculine-neuter dative singular of adjectival declension also raises to -ymi, as does the instrumental plural of adjectival declensions: złymu; starymy. Prenasal raising does not occur in the prefixes we- (due to wy-) or prze- (due to przy-). Soft eN after a soft consonant raises to yN in most of the region, but raises to iN in Skierniewice County and some neighboring villages, e.g. dziyń or dziń; in some words it raises to iN across the whole region, e.g. grzebiń, kamiń.

oN and óN are both realized as uN: dum, du mnie.

The cluster yN remains unchanged, iN changes to yN after j-: jyno but klin. Historically, younger people sometimes lowered iNC, yNC to é: jénteres. The clusters yN, iN can lower to é in inflections: z dobrém paném.

The cluster uNV remains unchanged, but uNC lowers to óNC: kuma but bónta. The suffix -unek is often realized as -ónek: gatónek.

In terms of nasal vowels, most of the region realizes ą as õ (or more often decompose as óN or in some regions uN) and ę as ɪ̃ (or more often decompose as yN it as éN); a few villages in the southwest part of Skierniewice County lose all nasality and they merge with o, e respectively. The distribution of nasals is mostly the same, with some differences. Secondary nasalization can sporadically occur, but conversely original nasality can be lost. Final -ę merges with -e; wymie, ide. The loss of nasality (except -ę) was often derided and therefore lost, and overcorrection can occur as a result: śnięg. The inflectional ending -ą is realized as -óm. Verbs ending in -nąć usually lose nasality in the past tense, but sometimes are formed with -n- if the stem contains a nasal consonant: staneła, staneł, zginuł, but wzión, wziyna.

==== Prothesis ====
Initial o- generally prelabializes to ô-, a feature clear in the consciousness of speakers and often taught at schools as a pronunciation to be avoided, medial labialization of o occurred mostly after velar and labial consonants, less often and more weakly after other consonants: gôdzina, bôgać, ciôtka; it always labializes after r: rôk – labialization does not occur in Skierniewice County and neighboring regions. In Byczki, the cluster /wɔ/, regardless if comes from labialization or ło could historically be realized as [wɜ], which was often ridiculed by others and was avoided.

Initial and syllable-initial u- labializes to û: ûcyć sie, naûka.

=== Consonants ===
w undergoes forward devoicing: ćwierć is realized as ćfierć, and Vwi reduces to Vji: jałojice. The masculine dative singular is -eji due to sound changes: chłopokeji. The rare masculine nominative plural ending -owie does not reduce to *-oje. The cluster Vwo and Vwu can change to Vło and Vłu: dziełosłómb. Similarly, b may sporadically replace w: grzyba (grzywa). Palatalized bilabials can somewhat decompose and show a stronger palatal element j, but this is not common everywhere. Soft m and ń can sporadically change places in individual words: misko, kunisyjo, wezne, weźnies.

Dark ł changed to /w/ in the 20th century. dl often shifts to l. li may harden: ślywki (śliwki). The masculine singlar past tense of consonant stem verbs lose final -ł: niós, nies.

Original rz is kept before labials: cierzpić and before ń: scerznić.

The cluster CnC (and if the second consonant is voiceless) reduces to CC: cołnek||cołka, cosnek||cosku. The groups szw-, żw-, and szk- can be realized as św-, źw-, and śk-: świagier, źwawo, śkoła. Similarly szn- > śn-: śniurek, żn- > źn-: podróźne, szp- > śp-: śpagat, szt- > śt-: śtuka, szpi- > śpi-: śpitol, szki-, ski- > śk-: kaśkiet, Śkierniejice, szl- > śl-: ślak, żl- > źl-: ûwoźliwy, żr- > źr-: źryć, and czt- > ćt-: ćtery. tw changes to kw: kwardy (twardy); tch to ćch: ćchórz (tchórz); tw to cw: łacwo (łatwo).

s may sometimes be geminated and then sometimes dissimilated: bosso, bosco (boso).

Sporadic softening may occur. Some instances of this are innovative, others archaic: bibiuły (bibuły), wesielo (wesela).

Velar consonants are the same as in standard Polish, but in verbal iteratives formed with -ywać, -iwać, k and g may be formed with either, where as ch always takes -ywać: podsłuchywać, poruchywać, but nasykywać||nasykiwać, sługywać||sługiwać. In Skierniewice County and neighboring regions, hard and soft velars may mix entirely due to influence from neighboring dialects: takie sukienkie. k when in front of a plosive changes to ch: dochtur. Similarly kn- > kch-: dotchnóńć and kł- > chł-: chłamać. Conversely, ch strengthens to k before a fricative or a liquid: kwolić, krzest.

The phone [ɣ] appeared present and distinct in the minds of speakers, with some speakers commenting that there is no way to write this phone in standard Polish: hebel, hulać. The distribution of this phone is limited and its position always initial: zhulnóńć.

=== Contraction ===
Verbs bać się and stać appear in uncontracted forms: sie bojała (bała się); bojić sie, stoić.

=== Other phonetic features ===
Adverbs and conjunctions ending in a vowel gain epenthetic -k or -t sentence medially or finally: nibyg nie, dopierok trza, terozt.

The clusters śr, źr are as in standard Polish: środek.

t and d in clusters with retroflex sibilants (Piotrz, drzazgi) are realized as retroflex [ʈ] and [ɖ].

Haplology may occur with verbs ending in -owywać: darywać, gotywać.

Stress is always penultimate: mu'zyka, but some compounds whose elements are clear to the speaker will accent both elements with primary stress on the second: ,zim'strok.

The words roz (raz), dzień, sie (się), and past tense endings function as clitics: dru'gie roz, bez 'dwa dni, spłaka'łam sie, be'liźwa (byliście).

== Inflection ==
Influences from multiple dialect groups can be seen in the inflection.

=== Nouns ===
Much leveling occurs here.

==== Masculine nouns ====
Masculine nouns ending in -o are common: tatusio, tatulo, stryjo, wujo, Jaśko, Stacho, Jantko, ksyncio.

The genitive singular is formed with -a more often than in standard Polish: druga, but -u can be seen instead of -a sometimes z boru, miodu, sadu, z bólu; via analogy and leveling to neuter -e nouns, the genitive singular of some soft-stem masculine nouns is sometimes formed with -o: Poznanio, Bochynio||do Bochynia, ze Zgierzo.

The vowel in the dative singular ending (standard -owi) is -(')o- or -(')e-, depending on region and not on the softness of the stem (despite the historical use of these endings depending on that). Most Księżak villages use -(')e-; the part of the region north of the villages of Świeryż, Marianka, Złaków Borowy, Łaźniki, Gągolin Południowy, and Sromów uses -(')o- as the result of influence of neighboring dialects of Sochaczew County. The consonant w' lost its labiality in the north, yielding the form -oji: synoji, wujoji. The same can be seen in -(')e- areas farther from Łowicz and other towns. However, the distribution of this phonetic change is very uneven and both -ewi and -eji can be found there: chłopokewi, Józwewi, dziadewi || sumsiadeji, syneji, ksiyndzeji. In the parish of Kocierzew, contamination between -oji and -u occurred and the ending -oju is used: wujoju, chłopoju. Overall -owi, -ewi is more common in the dative over -u.

The instrumental singular is formed with -ym.

The locative singular is formed with -u or -e, but their distribution for a few words differ: w boru. As a result of masuration, in the Duchy of Łowicz stems ending in etymological retroflex fricatives sz, ż are considered hard stems and thus take -e instead od standard -u: w krzyzie, na krzyzie, w kapalusie, po świyntym Mateusie, na kosie.

The nominative plural is usually formed with either -e: Miymce, ôjce or -y(-i): braty, rôbotniki, Rosyjany; Masuration also affects this: kalosy (standard kalosze); the endings -i (-y) and -owie are rarer: panowie, chłopcy; the words brat and ksiądz have kept an old plural bracio, księzo next to braty, ksiyndze; -a can be seen in grónta, bieleta (bilety).

The genitive plural is generally formed with -ów: braci next to bratów, księzy next to księzów; zająców, mulorzów, łokciów, móndralów; Rosyjanów, but ludzi, piyniyndzy, kóni; some place names retain -∅: z Mastek, Retek, Łoźnik, ze Skarotek, do Zdón, Strugiynic, Wierznojic, Dumaniejic, Małsyc, Grudz, do Łyśkojic; but also do Lipców, Drzewców, Trabów, Sapów, Pólków||Pólek, Retków. roz (raz) sometimes takes -∅: do trzecich roz.

The dative plural is formed with -um.

The instrumental plural is formed with -amy.

The locative plural is formed with -ach.

The word rok does not show suppletion: rôki, rôków.

Masculine nouns ending in -a, e.g. ôrganista including surnames Niedziela etc., decline according to feminine declension.

==== Neuter nouns ====
Three types of neuter nouns exist: I zyto, pole, II (from -é, realized as -e here) śniodanie, poście (standard post), and III wymie (rare, as *-nt nouns have mostly been replaced with -ok: cielok).

Type I and III form the genitive singular with -a: ôkna, zyta, słuńca, but type II forms it witih -o: zbozo, kozanio, śniodanio; sometimes type -o is used in the other types due to mizing: słuńco, serco – this process is strengthened by its spread to masculine nouns (see above).

The dative singular is usually formed with -u, but sometimes -oji, -eji can be seen: masłoji, zyteji.

The instrumental singular is formed with -ym.

The locative singular is formed with -u or -e: w sercu.

The nominative-accusative-vocative plural is formed with -a: zyta, jabka, ôkna; the forms bidła, wijadła also exceptionally show bidły, wijadły, but the dual forms ôcy, ûsy remain in use.

The genitive plural is formed with -∅: pól, kozań, śniodań, cielónt, rymión, but -ów can be seen: jabków, futrów, nazwisków; ôców, ûsów.

The dative plural is formed with -um.

The instrumental plural is formed with -amy, but -y can be seen in przede świynty, przede zniwy next to przed świyntamy, przed zniwamy.

The locative plural is formed with -ach.

==== Feminine nouns ====
Some consonantal stems become vocalic: mysa (mysz), struzo (stróż).

Hard stems take -a in the nominative singular and -ija/-yja nouns and most soft-stem nouns take -o: kobieta, burzo, groblo||grobla, famielijo||famielia||famielija.

The dative singular takes -y, -i: kobiety, matki.

The dative-locative singular takes -e or -i/-y; Masuration causes some old soft stems to take hard-stem -e, e.g. w ruzie (w róży), kasie (kaszy).

The accusative singular is formed with -e (denasalization of -ę) or -óm (< -ą): matkecke, matkie (via phonological softening), kobiete, ziymie, but rôlóm, dziezóm||dzieze; in Słupia, Maków, Bobrowa, Lipce, Drzewce, Janisławice and neighboring nasalless villages the ending -óm dominates, but also here occurs -o.

The instrumental singular is formed with -óm, -ą||-o.

The nominative-accusative-vocative plural of hard-stem nouns take -y/-i and soft-stem nouns ending in -ia, -ija take -e; -e used to dominate Proto-Slavic *-i stems: zapowiedzie.

The genitive plural is formed with -∅ for hard stems and -i ni soft stems: matek, śklónek, pieśni, but -ów is very common due to its distinctiveness: dziewcynów.

The dative plural is formed with -um.

The instrumental plural is formed with -amy, including old *-i stems: kościamy, gałęziamy.

The locative plural is formed with -ach.

The term syndzia||syndzio has mixed declension, e.g. accusative singular syndzie||syndzióm but also locative singular syndzi.

The term rynka shows old dual forms in the nominative-accusative-vocative plural: rynce and the stem rync- has spread to other cases as well: rynców, ryncach, ryncamy.

=== Pronouns ===
Declension of personal pronouns
	Singular					Plural				
	First person	Second person	Third person masculine	Third person neuter	Third person feminine	First person	Second person	Third person		
Nominative	jo	ty	ûn	ûno	ûna	my	wy	ûny	ûne	ûni (also respectful)
Genitive	mnie, mie	ciebie, cie	jego, niego, ûnego, go		jeji, ni, ûny	nos	wos (woju in Słupia, Białynin)	jejich, nich, ich, ûnych		
Dative	mnie, my	ciebie, tobie, ci	jymu, ûnymu, mu		i, ûny	nóm	wóm (woma, woju in Białynin)	jym, ûnym		
Accusative	mnie, mie	ciebie, cie	jego, niego, ûnego, go	jego, niego, ûnego, go, je	jóm, ją, jo	nos	wos	nie, je, ich, nich, ûnych		
Instrumental	mnóm, mną, mno	tobóm, tobą, tobo	nym, ûnym		nióm, nią, nio	namy	wamy	niymy, ûnymy		
Locative	mnie	ciebie, tobie	nym, ûnym		ni, ûny	nos	wos	jejich, nich, ich, ûnych		
Vocative	-	te	-							

The genitive forms jeji, jejich arose via analogy to jego, jemu and is used generally as a possessive article.

Declension of the reflexive pronoun
Nominative	-
Genitive	siebie
Dative	siebie, sobie
Accusative	sie, siebie
Instrumental	sobóm
Locative	siebie, sobie
Vocative	-

Declension of the interrogative pronouns kto, co
Nominative	chto	co
Genitive	kogo	cego
Dative	kumo	cymu
Accusative	kogo	co
Instrumental	kiym	cym
Locative	kiym	cym
Vocative	-	-

The genitive forms kogo can replace the possessive pronoun czyj.

Indeterminate pronouns can be extended as -siś: chtoś||chtosiś, coś, cosiś, jakisiś, jakosiś.

The negated pronouns nicht, nic show genitive nikoguj, niceguj in some regions next to nikug in others.

The ending -kolwiek may be shortened to -lek: chtolek, colek, jakilek next to extended chtoniebóńdź, coniebóńdź, jakiniebóńdź.

Other pronouns, e.g. tyn, totyn, zodyn, mój, twój, swój, nas, was, sóm, wszystek, jedyn show adjectival declension, but the feminine for nas, was may show -a next to -o: naso dzieucho, wasa Mańka; other possessive pronouns show -a, kozdy and zadny always show -o and sóm and jedyn always show -a, tyn, totyn, and jedyn always show -o in the neuter singular, but kozdy and zodny always show -e; all of these pronouns show mixing in the accusative feminine singular with either -óm or -e (< ę). The possessive pronouns mój, twój swój never show contracted forms like twa, swego. The term tyli (tyla, tyle) (tantus) corresponds with ili (ila, ile) (quantus).

=== Adjectives ===
Some nominal declension of short adjectives can still be seen in possessive adjectives: Wróblów chłopok, Marysin Fartuch, Wieteskowa dzieucha, babcina przyndza, but Wieteskowo, Wielcowo and bratowe gospodarstwo.

The nominative masculine singular is always -y, -i, but their distribution may differ: poprzecni, telni, the nominative feminine singular is formed with -o: ładno, głupio (notably feminine surnames formed with -ino/-yno take nominal declension; -owo takes adjectival declension); the nominative neuter singular takes -e: corne, zytnie.

The genitive masculine-neuter singular is formed with -ego: biołnego, bladziyńkiego, but in Mszadla and Drzewce newer -ygo can occur: duzygo, na świéntygo.

The genitive-dative-locative feminine singular is formed with -y/-i: corny ziymi, bez ciepły rynkajicy; dek ty głupi Marysi; due to phonetic processes this ending has merged with the feminine genitive nominal ending; this has also occurred in the dative and locative of soft-stem nouns.

The dative masculine-neuter singular is formed with -ymu: nijakiymu, głupiymu, starymu, złymu.

The accusative-instrumental feminine singular is formed with -óm, -ą, -o depending on the region, gender, and age of speaker.

The instrumental-locative masculine-neuter singular is formed with -ym: małym, miyntkiym.

The rare nominative virile plural, usually used as a respectful form, is formed with -i: nasi; in some places this is -y: głusy, otherwise the nominative plural is formed with -e.

The genitive-locative plural is formed with -ich, -ych: głupich, cornych.

The dative plural is formed with -ym: wielkiym, sielnym; given that this form is homophonous with the instrumental-locative masculine-neuter singular, the hypercorrection form -én occurs: zmarłém dusóm, złém dziecióm.

The instrumental plural is formed with -ymy: złymy, ciynkiymy.

==== Gradation of adjectives and adverbs ====
Generally the distribution of endings is that of standard Polish: ładniejsy, krótsy, but with some differences: lekcejsy||lechcejsy, słodsy, etc. – in general -ejsy sees more use.

The adverbial comparative ending -ej raises to -y/-i: barzy, lepi, sładni, krócy||kródzy, miynkcy, lekcy, przudzi||przudy.

The superlative of adjectives and adverbs is formed with no-/noj-, naj-.

=== Cardinal and collective numerals ===
The numeral jedyn takes adjectival declension.

The numeral dwa takes the genitive-locative forms dwoch||dwóch; ôba always takes ôbuch; the dative-instrumental is formed as dwóma||dwiyma; ôba takes ôbóma||ôbiyma – the distribution of these forms does not depend on gender; by analogy the forms dwóma, ôbōma occur; the innovative dative forms dwóm, ûbóm, ôbóm occur.

The numeral trzy shows an alternative nominative form trze in the phrase trze dni in some villages, otherwise trzy dni probably as a result of clitic stress; the dative-instrumental is trzyma or, by analogy to dwóma, trzóma; the dative may also be trzym.

The numeral śtery||ćtery takes the genitive-locative śterech, the dative-instrumental śeryma||śteruóma||ćteróma.

The numerals 5-10 in the genitive-locative have nominal *-i feminine declension with reflexes of length in the penultimate syllable: piónci, szóści, siódmi, ûśmi, dzieióńci; piyńdziesióńci, siedymdziesióńci; in the dative-instrumental fluctuation occurs: z pióńci pumocnikamy; ôśmi chłopum but dziesióńciuma pocierackum, pióńcióm krześniokum, sześcióma.

The genitive-locative of sto and its compounds can vary: sta, ćterysta, dwiestu, dwuchstu; dative-instrumental dwiestu.

The masculine virile forms dwaj, obaj do not occur here.

Other non-virile forms also dominate: jedynoście chłopców, trzynoście gospodorzy.

Collective numerals occur, but their distribution differs: dwa ûsy, ôcy, ôbaśta sykowały (of a brother and sister); but troje pakuł, dwoje portek, cworo protek, piyńcioro bydła, piyńcioro kóni; always dwoje śwyni, dwoje prosiónt – dwoje, troje are used with counting animals as well as inanimate nouns and sometimes children. Instrumental forms include trójmy, sześciurgo, piyńciórga – other cases do not occur, suggesting the foreignness of these numerals to the dialect.

Ordinal numerals for years can differ: dwadzieścia drugi rôk, siedymdziesiónt ûsmy rôk.

Multiplicative numerals take -ysty: cworzysty, trojysty, dwojysty.

The indeterminate numerals kilka, pare are sometimes replaced with chtóry: polezy chtóry dzień.

=== Verbs ===
Singular endings do not differ much from standard Polish, notably in je||jest; the first person plural retains the old dual suffix -wa often instead of -my: mómy||mowa, also mielimy; this ending -wa occurs dominates in the past tense as well next to other endings: daliźwa, lubiwa, but -my is displacing -wa; in Skierniewice county -wa is limited to the imperative; in general -wa dominates in the imperative throughout the area: chodźwa; the second person plural is always -ta, inherited from the old dual ending, now only for plural; the ending -cie occurs as a respectful ending: patrzta; pódziecie. The first person plural imperative may also be formed with -ma: nieśma (nieśmy). The third person plural of verbs may sometimes be -eli instead of Standard Polish -ali.

Past tense forms
jo	zym niós, chodzieł, chodził, chodziuł or niózym, chodziełym, chodziłym, chodziułym
ty	ześ niós, chodzieł, chodził, chodziuł or nióześ, chodziełeś, chodziłeś, chodziułeś
ûn	niós, chodzieł, chodził, chodziuł
my	-źwa nieśli, chodzieli or nieśliźwa, nieśliźmy, nieślimy
wy	-śta nieśli, chodzieli or nieśliśta, chodzieliśta
wy (respectful)	-ście nieśli, chodzieli or nieśliście, chodzieliście
ûni (respectful, sometimes plural)	nieśli, chodzieli

Plural forms without clitics, e.g. my chodzieli, my jom trzymali, occur in Bobrowa; forms with zym, ześ etc. occur in Złaków Borowy, Złaków Kościelny, Chąśno, and Sierakowice; this also occurs with copulative sentences: jo zym choro (Strugienice), jo zym beł hybitny (Łaźniki)||jo bełym kwacki (Bogoria Górna).

In the future tense, reflexes of będę, będziesz etc. connect with masculine singular -ł forms, otherwise the infinitive is used: byne jod, bedzies krzycoł, bedziewa źli, bénóm śpiewać, bede iść, bede mić, bedzieta gotować.

The active adverbial participle is rare outside of set phrases; the active adjectival participle occurs more often as predicative for expressing certain constant traits: ûn je znajóncy, ûn je nolezóncy do wojska, nieborosko gmina nie nalezónco do Księstwa, jo zym sielnie mortwiónco.

Passive adjective participles formed with -n- generally level and lose e:o alternation: napasóny, napasóna, napasóne, napasóni.

The infinitive of -eć verbs often raise to -yć, -ić via leveling: drzyć, źryć, ûmrzyć, cierzpić, słysyć.

==== Conjugation I ====
As a result of leveling, ablaut of *e > o is absent in the first person singular and third person plural: niese, wieze, plete, wiede, piere, biere; niesóm||niesą||nieso. Many labial stem verbs, which generally belong to conjungation III in standard Polish, instead belong here: grzebe, skube, sype; rómbe, złume, but grzebióm, skubióm; the presence of a hard labial in the first person singular (grzebe) is to differentiate it from the third person singular, which would sound identical after the denasalization of final -ę; this hardening can occur in other verbs as well.

In the past tense, vocalic alternation occurs: niós – nieśli: niesła, niesło, niesły; this occurs secondarily via leveling in some other verbs.

Velar stems form the imperative sometimes with -c: zaprzónc||zaprzęgni, pómóc||pómóz; in forms like piec, słuc, it is difficult to say it this is c < c or c < cz via Masuration.

Infinitives ending in -ść, -źć do not change.

The word iść retains -n- in prefixed derivations: weńde, wyńde, dońde, przeńde, przyńde, zańde, nańde, but póde, pódzies, imperative pódzi; the past tense is sedym, sedeś (never szłem > *słem), sliźwa, śliśta, etc.

==== Conjugation II ====
The imperative is formed with -i, -icie: ciśni – ciśnicie, rzni – rznicie, cióngni – ciągnicie; rwi – rwicie, zajrzy – zajrzycie.

The masculine past tense -ął levels to -eł: nioseł, wiozeł or in Skierniewice county to -ył/-ił/-uł. Verbs ending in -nąć often do not have -ną-, -nę- in declensions: pragła (pragnęła).

The passive adjectival participle is formed with -ty: wycióngniynty, porzniynty, zadrapniynty.

==== Conjugation III ====
Type a forms include: zyje, zyjes, zyje, zyjecie, zyjóm; imperative zyj, zyjcie, zyjta; past tense zeł, zeła, zeli, zeły; passive adjectival participle przezyty.

The imperative of -ać verbs is formed with -ej, -ejmy, -ejta, -ejcie except in the southeast, where it is -oj, -ojcie, -ojta, -ojmy.

The verbs mleć, pleć undergo much reshaping, including present miele, mielóm, piele, pielóm, which gives pielić, pieleł, pieleła, zmieleł; piel; pieli, zemlis. The infinitive may also be mlić, pl ić, which give pleła, pleł, mleł; pleły||mluł, pluł; zemlułym; pleli; plóm. The most common past tense forms are piuł, zmiuł:piełła, zmiełła; the gerund is always pielynie, mielynie.

Type b forms include: pise, pises, pise, pisewa, piseta, pisecie, pisóm; pisoł, pisała; napisane.

The verbs grzoć, dzioć, śmioć sie, wioć, loć underwent contraction of *-eja- > o (via á), but underwent levelling to -m verbs and show ablaut: loł – lała, grzoł – grzała, sioł – siała; past tense leli, grzeli, śmieli, sieli.

Type c forms include: pasuje, pasujes, pasuje, pasujewa, pasujóḿ/pasują/pasujo, pasuj, pasujta, pasujcie; pasować.

Type d forms include: cytóm, cytos, cyto, cytajóm/cytają/cytajo; cytej||cytoj; cytoł, cytała; cytać.

==== Conjugation IV ====
Group I forms include: chodze, chodzis, chodzi, chodziwa, chodzóm/chodzą/chodzo; imperative chodzi-no; past tense forms always take -eł, -eła, -eło, -eli, -eły due to sound changes; men of Sierakowice, Bełchów, Stachlew, Bobrowa sometimes use -uł; in Skierniewice County rarely use -eł, next to -ył||-uł; -u- always occurs in places where ł is realized as /w/; in open syllables one also sees -eła||-yła.

Group II forms include: muse, musis, musi, musiwa, musimy, musóm/musą/muso; musioł, musiała, musieli, musiały; musić; this also includes świecić – świecioł, świeciała, przykrzyć – przykrzało; chropić – chrapioł.

==== Conjugation V ====
Present tense forms of być include: jezdym, jezdeś, je||jest, jezdeźwa, jezdeśta, jezdeście, sóm/są/so; the form je occurs utterance finally; sentence medially both je and jest occur but je dominates: do Łyskojic je noblizy||pani jez dobro; jez miynkcejsy. Future tense forms include bede, bedzies, bedzie, bedóm/bedą/bedo, but also byne – bynóm in some villages. The past tense is like the typical compound past: jo zym beł||jo bełym; in Skierniewice County the form buł dominates.

The verb jeść geminates the initial j in the present tense and imperative: jjym, jjes, jje, jjewa, jjeta||jedzóm/jedzą/jedzo; jjedz; past tense jod, jadła, jedli, jadly.

Forms of wiedzić (standard wiedzieć) include wiym, wies, wie, wiewa||wiymy, wiecie, wiedzóm, wiedzioł, wiedziała, wiedzieli.

Forms of dać include dóm, dos, do, dowa, dota, docie, dadzóm/dadzą/dadzo; imperative dej, dejcie (everywhere); doł, dała, dali, dały; passive adjective participle dany.

=== Prepositions and prefixes ===
Mobile e occurs more often in the prefixes/prepositions w(e)(-), z(e)(-), przed(e)(-), nad(e)(-), and bez(e)(-) than in standard Polish: we we młynie, ze lném/lnym, przede zniwy, nade drogóm, beze drzwi, and w is always realized as we when the next word begins with w-: we wozie; similarly z is realized as ze when the next word begins with a sibilant: ze sobóm, ze siostróm, zesadzić.

== Vocabulary ==
=== Word-Formation ===
Influences from multiple dialect groups can be seen in the word-formation.

==== Nouns ====
Surnames for wives are formed with -ka (usually after consonantals): Dunajok – Dunajocka (wife of Dunajok) or -ino/-yno (usually after vowels): Deka – Decyno (wife of Deka), Gajda – Gajdzino, Grzyb – Grzybino; less of with -owo, which is sometimes understood as a possessive ending and realized as -owa kobieta ('s woman/wife), because the first two suffixes are more common for wives and -owo is common for daughters, hence the clarifying "kobieta". Surnames for daughters may similarly be derived from -owa dzieucha or -ów chłopok; -owe can be used for "children" in the plural or the family as a whole. Sometimes the nominative plural as accusative is used as well: Gasikowe||Gasiki or the genitive of -ski||-cki: Golasieskiego kôbieta/dzieucha/chłopok. The suffix -ówna for is rare: Dunajówna. These feminine suffixes can also be added to words denoting professions. Feminine surnames formed from a surname ending in a vowel take -anka/-ónka: Wrublónka or from -ska||-cka: Głowaccónka. Surnames for sons may also be formed with -ok: Gajdziok. Masculine demonyms can be formed with -ok and feminine with -ónka; corresponding adjectives can be formed with -ski: Bełchów – Bełchowiok – Bełchowiónka – bełchoski.

-ónek may form nouns more often than standard -unek: myślónek.

The demonym suffix -anin reduces to -an: miescan.

Diminutives occur more often than in standard Polish and common endings include: -o: tatulo, -ek (masculine), -ka (feminine), -ko (neuter): dziodek, babka, -yk/-ił: kosyk, -osek: ptosek, -usek||-ysek: sercusko, wionysek, -uscek for Proto-Slavic *y stems: kamuscek.

Augmentatives may occur more frequently: lisa (from liszka), sómsiada (from sąsiadka).

Words denoting baby animals rarely take -e (< -ę), ciele, only for very small animals or as a vocative, more often -ok: cielok.

Ceremonies are formed with -iny more often: zmówiny.

The possessive suffixes -in and -ów remain productive, especially for surnames of wives, sons, and daughters.

==== Adjectives ====
-ejszy may be used for comparatives of adjectives in place of Standard Polish -szy. However, sometimes -ni can be seen in place of Standard Polish -ny for some adjectives: tylni (tylny).

Adjectives denoting materials are often formed with -anny: jyncmanny; -sty and -ity are generally used over -asty and -isty; kałduniaty, mysity; pejorative adjectives are formed with -achny: wielgachny; diminutive adjectives are formed with -uchny, -utki, -yńki and for colors these endings add a meaning of "bright": blady ("pink") bladziyńki ("light pink"); koździuchny ("each and every").

==== Verbs ====
The prefix roz- is usually realized as ôz-: ôztworzyć, ôztwora(||roztwora), but roz- may be seen.

The prefix z- retains archaic voicelessness in the terms śliźć, słazić, but next to zliźć, złazić.

The verbal suffixes -iwać/-ywać and -ować are highly productive, especially for iteratives: bawiwać, piekywać, przemyśliwać, nasypować. The verbs dawać and stawać are formed as dajać and stajać. The suffix -ewać occurs in grewać, srewać. -jmować verbs (< jąć) are formed with -ać: zajmać, przyjmać, wyjmać; a few other verbs are also formed with this suffix: kupać.

The prefix pa- sees some use still: pamrocki, pasmugi, pazłota, pazłotka, pacesie, Patoki, pawuj.

Double prefixed verbs are rare here in contrast to standard Polish: ponasykywać, powystrzeliwać.

The distribution of prefixes or their presence or absence can differ from standard Polish.

== Syntax ==
Masculine personal declension is generally leveled to masculine animal declension: Kôzy (a family name), tamte ôjce; nase chłopy miełały; dziewiynć strôzoków; te biedne ludzie ôstali. However, the accusative plural of masculine animate nouns is often equivalent to the genitive: zabieł trzech zajunców. Plural forms may be used to show respect: nasi babka sóm juz lisi; in the parish of Złaków Kościelny and some neighboring villages, adjectives may still appear in the singular: moji matka beli juz tako licho; moja matka ôzynili sie.

The gender of nouns can differ: (masculine when in standard Polish otherwise) butelek, nieśpur, pumaraniec, dysiel, ûd (udo), ôpol, potrzeb (||potrzeba), topul, tómpul (||topola, tómpola), podeszew (||podeszwa); (neuter when in standard Polish otherwise) poście, brzucho; (feminine when in standard Polish otherwise) snowadel.

The preposition bez is used instead of standard polish przez: bez dziurke (przez dziurkę).

Dwa may be used for feminine nouns instead of dwie: dwa świnie (dwie świnie). Masovian na dwór (outside) is used instead of Lesser Polish na pole.

Adjectives and adverbs can sometimes substitute one other: ûn bardzo spowiednig je; śwyni mómy galantych.

The accusative can replace the genitive as an adverbial of time: Chodzieła łuńskóm zime (zeszłej zimy) do skoły.

Impersonal sentences are usually built with ûno: ûno bedzie padało (it will be raining); especially for sentences expressing bodily or spiritual states: ûno cie musiało zawiać.

== See also ==
- Dialects of the Polish language
- Languages of Europe
- Polish language

== Bibliography ==
- Karaś, Halina (2010). "Łowickie". dialektologia.uw.edu.pl.
- Świderska, Halina (2014) [1929]. Dialekt Księstwa Łowickiego [The Dialect of the Duchy of Łowicz] (in Polish). Łowicz: Powiatowa Biblioteka Publiczna w Łowiczu. ISBN 978-83-929702-4-8.
- Kozanecka-Zwierz, Marzena; Bartosiewicz, Magdalena; Marciniak-Firadza, Renata, eds. (2014). Gwara - Księżaków "język ojczysty". Dziedzictwo regionu łowickiego (in Polish). Łowcz: Muzeum w Łowiczu. ISBN 978-83-61093-40-4.
