= Czech Republic national under-19 football team =

Sports team

Czech Republic Under-19
- Association: Fotbalová asociace České republiky (FAČR)
- Head coach: Václav Jílek
- Most caps: Michal Sadílek (29)
- Top scorer: Tomáš Necid (14)
- FIFA code: CZE
First colours	Second colours

First international
- Czech Republic 4–1 Greece (Lipnice, Czech Republic; 18 September 2001)

Biggest win
- Czech Republic 13–0 Andorra (Mnichovo Hradiště, Czech Republic; 13 October 2001)

Biggest defeat
- Spain 5–1 Czech Republic (Tallinn, Estonia; 21 May 2009) Records are for competitive matches only

FIFA U-20 World Cup
- Appearances: 6 (first in 1983)
- Best result: Runners-up (2007)

European Championship
- Appearances: 7 (first in 2002)
- Best result: Runners-up (2011)

The Czech Republic national under-19 football team is the national under-19 football team of the Czech Republic and is controlled by the Football Association of the Czech Republic. The team competes in the UEFA European Under-19 Championship, held every year. As of June 2011, their biggest achievement is third place in the UEFA European Under-19 Championships, which they have achieved on three occasions: 2003, 2006 and 2008.

== Competitive record ==
=== UEFA European U-19 Championship record ===
Year	Result	Pld	W	D*	L	GF	GA
(Norway) 2002	Group stage	3	1	1	1	4	6
(Liechtenstein) 2003	Semi-finals	4	1	1	2	7	8
(Switzerland) 2004	did not qualify						
(Northern Ireland) 2005	did not qualify						
(Poland) 2006	Semi-finals	4	2	0	2	7	6
(Austria) 2007	did not qualify						
(Czech Republic) 2008	Semi-finals	4	1	1	2	6	6
(Ukraine) 2009	did not qualify						
(France) 2010	did not qualify						
(Romania) 2011	Runners-up	11	7	2	2	18	9
(Estonia) 2012	did not qualify						
(Lithuania) 2013	did not qualify						
(Hungary) 2014	did not qualify						
(Greece) 2015	did not qualify						
(Germany) 2016	did not qualify						
(Georgia (country)) 2017	Semi-finals	4	2	0	2	5	4
(Finland) 2018	did not qualify						
(Armenia) 2019	Group stage	3	0	1	2	1	5
(Northern Ireland) ~~2020~~	Cancelled						
(Romania) ~~2021~~	Cancelled						
(Slovakia) 2022	did not qualify						
(Malta) 2023	did not qualify						
(Northern Ireland) 2024	did not qualify						
(Romania) 2025	did not qualify						
(Wales) 2026	did not qualify						
(Czech Republic) 2027	Qualified						
Total	7/21	33	14	6	13	48	44

*Draws include knockout matches decided by penalty shootout.
**Gold background colour indicates that the tournament was won.
***Red border colour indicates tournament was held on home soil.

== Players ==
=== Current squad ===
The following players were called up for a friendly tournament in Spain against Scotland, Sweden and Germany on 27 September – 3 October 2026.

Caps and goals updated as of 25 September 2026 before the match against Scotland.

No.	Pos.	Player	Date of birth (age)	Caps	Goals	Club
	GK	Adam Bitta	24 April 2008 (age 18)	0	0	(Football Association of the Czech Republic) Polanka
	GK	Matěj Hacaperka	22 April 2008 (age 18)	0	0	(Football Association of the Czech Republic) Viktoria Plzeň
	GK	Mathias Škodoň	7 January 2008 (age 18)	0	0	(Football Association of the Czech Republic) Viktoria Žižkov
	DF	Michal Folprecht	7 September 2008 (age 18)	0	0	(Football Association of the Czech Republic) Dukla Prague
	DF	Milan Hendericks	28 August 2008 (age 18)	0	0	(Royal Dutch Football Association) Venlo
	DF	Jan Knobloch	21 November 2008 (age 17)	0	0	(Football Association of the Czech Republic) Mladá Boleslav
	DF	Lukáš Linhart	9 March 2008 (age 18)	0	0	(Football Association of the Czech Republic) Viktoria Plzeň
	DF	Sebastian Pech	5 January 2009 (age 17)	0	0	(Football Association of the Czech Republic) Teplice
	DF	Matyáš Syrovátka	1 April 2008 (age 18)	0	0	(Football Association of the Czech Republic) Hradec Králové
	DF	Lukáš Vaněk	13 January 2008 (age 18)	0	0	(Football Association of the Czech Republic) Hradec Králové
	MF	Kryštof Čížek	4 January 2008 (age 18)	0	0	(German Football Association) TSG Hoffenheim
	MF	Ondřej Frolík	2 July 2008 (age 18)	0	0	(Football Association of the Czech Republic) Slavia Prague
	MF	Filip Hruška	29 August 2008 (age 18)	0	0	(Football Association of the Czech Republic) Slovácko
	MF	Nikola Jadrníček	15 February 2008 (age 18)	0	0	(Football Association of the Czech Republic) Sigma Olomouc
	MF	Vincent Kotíšek	21 April 2008 (age 18)	0	0	(Football Association of the Czech Republic) Sparta Prague
	MF	Martin Palaščák	25 March 2008 (age 18)	0	0	(Football Association of the Czech Republic) Slavia Prague
	FW	Martin Beránek	16 July 2008 (age 18)	0	0	(Football Association of the Czech Republic) Pardubice
	FW	Idris Hopi	12 May 2008 (age 18)	0	0	(Football Association of the Czech Republic) Teplice
	FW	David Lášek	18 August 2008 (age 18)	0	0	(Football Association of the Czech Republic) Loko Prague
	FW	Petr Potměšil	19 January 2008 (age 18)	0	0	(Football Association of the Czech Republic) Slavia Prague
	FW	Matouš Srb	1 September 2009 (age 17)	0	0	(German Football Association) Bayern Munich
	FW	Filip Végh	25 September 2008 (age 18)	0	0	(Football Association of the Czech Republic) Jablonec

=== Leading appearances ===
As of 16 October 2025.

#	Player	Caps
1	Michal Sadílek	29
2	Pavel Malchárek	24
2	Jiří Skalák	24
4	Martin Klein	23
4	Tomáš Přikryl	23
6	Adam Varadi	22
6	Jakub Dohnálek	22
6	Dominik Mašek	22
6	Lukáš Buchvaldek	22
10	Marcel Gecov	21
10	Ladislav Krejčí	21
10	Daniel Trubač	21
10	Ondřej Šašinka	21

=== Leading goalscorers ===
As of 16 October 2025.

#	Player	Goals
1	Tomáš Necid	14
2	Dominik Mašek	9
3	Pavel Fořt	7
3	Pavel Malchárek	7
3	Jan Schulmeister	7
3	Patrik Schick	7
3	Ondřej Šašinka	7
8	6 players	6

== See also ==
- Czech Republic men's national football team
- Czech Republic men's national under-21 football team
- Czech Republic men's national under-18 football team
- Czech Republic men's national under-17 football team
- Czech Republic women's national football team
- Czech Republic women's national under-19 football team
- Czech Republic women's national under-17 football team
