= Wicie =

Wicie may refer to the following places:

- Wicie, Łódź Voivodeship (central Poland)
- Wicie, Masovian Voivodeship (east-central Poland)
- Wicie, West Pomeranian Voivodeship (north-west Poland)
