= Anna Nakwaska =

Polish author and educationist (1779 or 1781-1851)

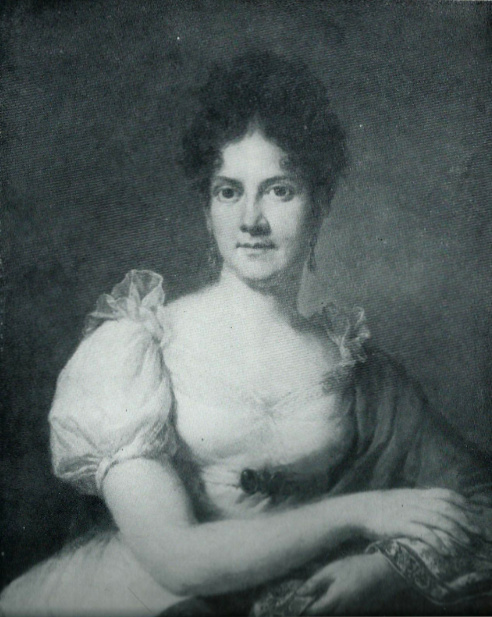
Marcello Bacciarelli, Portrait of Anna Nakwaska 1815

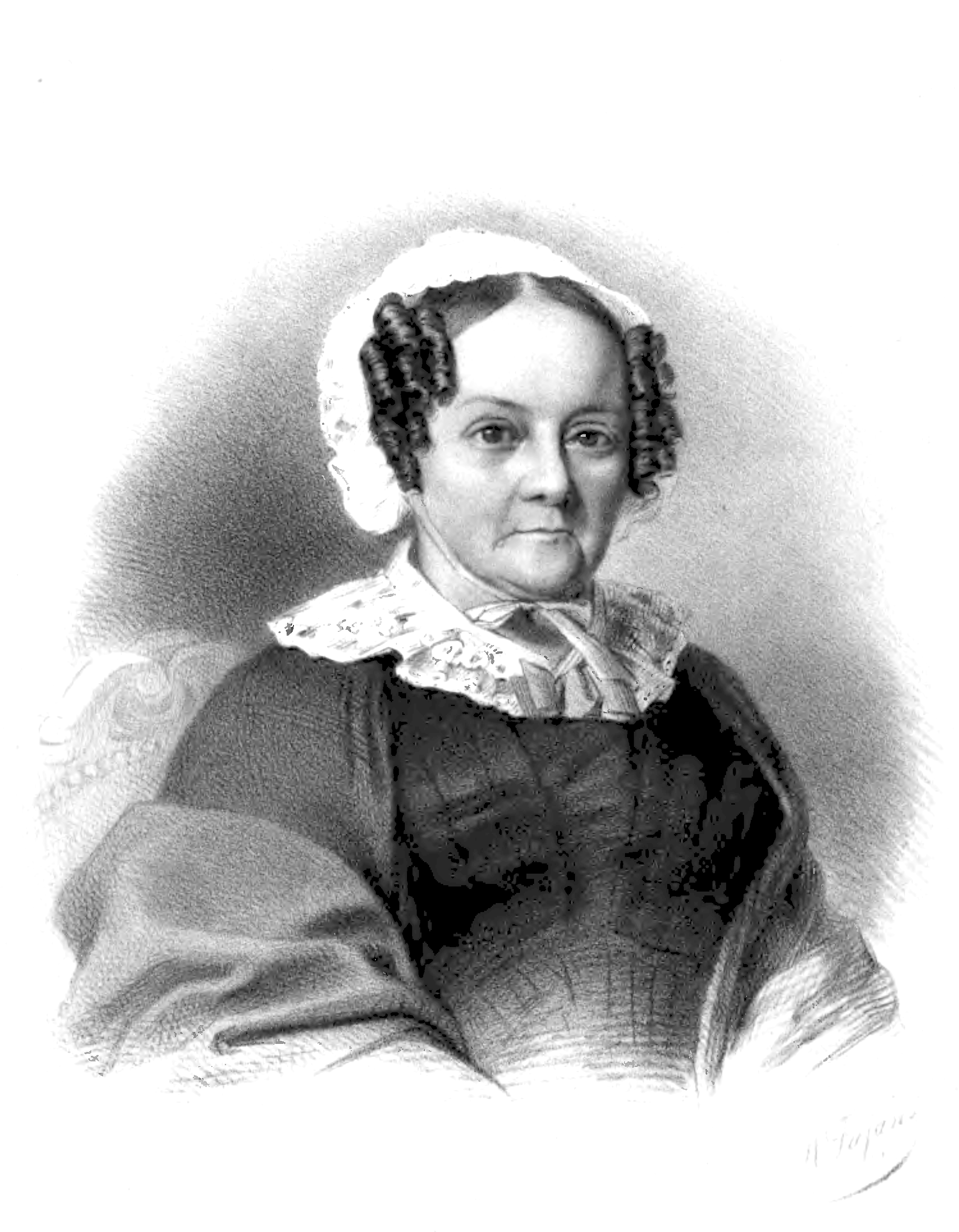
Anna Nakwaska in middle age

Anna Nakwaska née Krajewska (born 28 March 1781 in Warsaw, died 21 October 1851 in Mała Wieś (powiat Płock)) – was a Polish fiction writer, memoirist, children's author and educationist.

== Biography ==
She was born the daughter of Stanisław Kostka Krajewski, a royal courtier, and his wife Franciszka née Kluszewska. She was home schooled in Warsaw and on the country estate although all of her lessons were in French. She married a Senator, Franciszek Salezy Nakwaski, who from 1799 became prefect of the Warsaw region in the Duchy of Poland and then progressed to Voyevoda in Congress Poland. The couple had a son, Henryk, born in 1800, who was later to become a political activist and emigrant in France. They initially lived in Lipnice near Płock, but often travelled to the capital where she was a member of the Society in the Palac pod Blacha and an active participant in its cultural life. In the home of Stanisław Sołtyk, she got to know people like, Franciszek Salezy Dmochowski, L. Osiński and Onufry Kopczyński. During the Duchy period, she was an inspector of girls' schools and a member of the committee overseeing the education of women. At the same time, she pursued her own studies in Polish language and literature. After the collapse of the November uprising, she would spend the summer months on the Mała Wieś estate, returning to Warsaw for the winter months. In 1837 she left for Switzerland and in 1844 she visited Lower Silesia and Breslau stopping off for a cure in Szczawnica.

== Creativity ==
From 1816, she had established a Literary salon in Warsaw, which enjoyed great popularity over many years. She wrote novels (Czarna mara, Obraz warszawskiego społeczeństwa w dwóch powieściach spisany), children's stories and historical fiction based on the uprising, (Aniela, czyli Ślubna obrączka, Powstaniec litewski). In 1852, the Warsaw Daily, 'Gazeta Warszawska' published an extract from her memoirs and several decades later, in 1891 a further extract appeared in Kronika Rodzinna- the Family Chronicle. Till now, her memoirs have not been published in their entirety.

== Notable works ==
1. Trois nouvelles, publiées par une Polonaise, Warsaw 1821
2. Suite des Trois nouvelles, publiées par une Polonaise, Warsaw 1821
3. Obraz warszawskiego społeczeństwa w dwóch powieściach, powst. przed 31 grudnia 1830, publ.. Poznań 1842,
4. Aniela, czyli ślubna obrączka. Powieść narodowa, Warsaw 1831; translated from the French: Angélique ou l'anneau nuptial. Nouvelle polonaise. Épisode de la dernière révolution. Publié par Adolphe comte de Krosnowski, Paris 1833 (2 editions); a German translation and one in Italiani: L'Anello. Episodio della revoluzione polacca del 1830 w: Novelle polacche di diversi autori, Milan 1863 "Biblioteca Nuova" nr 19
5. Powstaniec litewski. Obraz romantyczny z czasów rewolucji w Polsce 1831 r., powst. 1832, wyd. Leipzig 1845, (wyd. pod pseudonimem: pani T...ka – który Estreicher odczytuje jako: pani T(rza)ska)
6. Odwiedziny babuni, czyli powieści dla zabawy grzecznych dzieci, Warsaw 1833–1834; wyd. 2: t. 1–2, Warsaw 1833–1834
7. Wody karlsbadzkie. Powieść z wydarzeń towarzyskich, powst. 1834, (wymienia ją Skimbirowicz)
8. Młodość Kopernika, "Jutrzenka" 1834, przedr. I. Polkowski w: Kopernikijana t. 3, Gniezno 1875; a French translation by Leonardowa Chodźkowa, La Pologne historique, littéraire, monumentale et illustrée, Paris 1839–1841, s. 227–234; przekł. polski z tego tłumaczenia ogł. noworocznik "Niezabudka" (Petersburg) 1844
9. Marguerite de Zembocin, "Revue du Nord" 1835
10. Wspomnienia z podróży po Szwajcarii i Tyrolu w roku 1837, "Przyjciel Ludu" 1838; rękopis: Biblioteka PAN Kraków, sygn. 1289
11. Czarna mara. Powieść historyczna. Kronika dawnego zamku książąt mazowieckich, powst. 1838, wyd. Warszawa 1841; wyd. następne: Gródek 1890; Warszawa 1898
12. Wspomnienia z czasów pruskich i Księstwa Warszawskiego (1792–1830), powst. około roku 1840; fragm.: Wyjątki z pamiętników współczesnych, ogł. J. Korzeniowski, "Gazeta Warszawska" 1852, nr 197-219; Ze wspomnień wojewodziny Nakwaskiej, "Kronika Rodzinna" 1891, nr: 4, 109, 135, 169, 197, 258, 293, 335, 356; rękopis był w posiadaniu S. Wasylewskiego; (F. Skarbek osnuł na tych wspomnieniach powieść: Pamiętniki Seglasa; wykorzystał je także J. Falkowski w: Obrazy z życia kilku ostatnich pokoleń w Polsce t. 1–5, Poznań 1877–1887
13. Niedzielne wieczory starego stolarza. Powieści dla rzemieślników, Leszno 1843; wyd. 2 Leszno 1858
14. Otton i Berta, "Pielgrzym" 1844, t. 1
15. Chrzestna matka w koronie, czyli pierwsze róże, "Pielgrzym" 1844, t. 2
16. Wspomnienia krótkiej podróży 1844 r. do Śląska, "Pielgrzym" 1845, t. 1–2
17. Testament. Powieść, niewydana, (inform. G. Korbut).

She placed pieces in Polish journals such as: "Jutrzenka" (1834), "Pamiętnik Warszawski" O przyczynach oziębłości mężczyzn dla kobiet, 1819; Krótki rzut oka na teraźniejsze wychowanie Polek, przez Polkę, 1820 – przedr. J. Sowiński: O uczonych Polkach, Warszawa 1821, s. 122), "Pielgrzym" (1844–1845), "Pierwiosnek" (1840–1843), "Przyjaciel Ludu" (1838), "Revue du Nord" (1835).

=== Translations ===
- M. Wirtemberska: Malvian, ou l'instinct du coeur. Traduit du polonais par une Polonaise t. 1–2, Warsaw 1817; Ed. 2: La Polonaise, ou l'instinct du coeur... t. 1–2, Paris 1822.

=== Letters ===
1. Ftpm M. Radziwiłł (later Krasińska) from 1794 to 1802, To T. and E. Rastawiecki in the years 1807–1815;
2. Letters from 1799 to 1830, in the Rastawiecki family archive;
3. To her sister, T. Rastawiecka, from 1806 to 1816 (in French).
4. To her sister, T. Rastawiecka, in 1808.

== Bibliography ==
- Bibliografia Literatury Polskiej – Vol. 5: Enlightenment, Nowy Korbut, publ. Państwowy Instytut Wydawniczy, Warsaw: 1967 pages 367–369
