= Szymanowice =

Szymanowice may refer to the following places in Poland:

- Szymanowice, Legnica County in Lower Silesian Voivodeship (south-west Poland)
- Szymanowice, Gmina Kostomłoty, Środa County in Lower Silesian Voivodeship (south-west Poland)
- Szymanowice, Łódź Voivodeship (central Poland)
- Szymanowice, Greater Poland Voivodeship (west-central Poland)
