= Wiskienica Górna =

- Village
- Location within Poland
- Coordinates: 52°11′13″N 19°43′54″E
- Country: Poland
- Voivodeship: Łódź
- County: Łowicz
- Gmina: Zduny

Wiskienica Górna [viskʲɛˈnit͡sa ˈɡurna] is a village in the administrative district of Gmina Zduny, within Łowicz County, Łódź Voivodeship, in central Poland.
