= Dąbrowa, Łowicz County =

Dąbrowa
- Village
- Location within Poland
- Coordinates: 52°09′08″N 19°46′49″E
- Country: Poland
- Voivodeship: Łódź
- County: Łowicz
- Gmina: Zduny

Dąbrowa [dɔmˈbrɔva] is a village in the administrative district of Gmina Zduny, within Łowicz County, Łódź Voivodeship, in central Poland.
