= Różyce, Łowicz County =

Różyce
- Village
- Location within Poland
- Coordinates: 52°14′N 19°59′E
- Country: Poland
- Voivodeship: Łódź
- County: Łowicz
- Gmina: Kocierzew Południowy

Różyce [ruˈʐɨt͡sɛ] is a village in the administrative district of Gmina Kocierzew Południowy, within Łowicz County, Łódź Voivodeship, in central Poland.
