= Osiek, Łowicz County =

Osiek
- Village
- Location within Poland
- Coordinates: 52°15′N 19°58′E
- Country: Poland
- Voivodeship: Łódź
- County: Łowicz
- Gmina: Kocierzew Południowy

Osiek [ˈɔɕɛk] is a village in the administrative district of Gmina Kocierzew Południowy, within Łowicz County, Łódź Voivodeship, in central Poland.
