= Jeziorko, Łowicz County =

Jeziorko
- Village
- Location within Poland
- Coordinates: 52°12′22″N 20°3′16″E
- Country: Poland
- Voivodeship: Łódź
- County: Łowicz
- Gmina: Kocierzew Południowy
- Population: 273

Jeziorko [jɛˈʑɔrkɔ] is a village in the administrative district of Gmina Kocierzew Południowy, within Łowicz County, Łódź Voivodeship, in central Poland.
