= Jackowice =

- Village
- Location within Poland
- Coordinates: 52°10′9″N 19°47′27″E
- Country: Poland
- Voivodeship: Łódź
- County: Łowicz
- Gmina: Zduny
- Population: 520

Jackowice [jat͡skɔˈvit͡sɛ] is a village in the administrative district of Gmina Zduny, within Łowicz County, Łódź Voivodeship, in central Poland.
