= Bogoria Pofolwarczna =

- Village
- Location within Poland
- Coordinates: 52°08′52″N 19°45′15″E
- Country: Poland
- Voivodeship: Łódź
- County: Łowicz
- Gmina: Zduny

Bogoria Pofolwarczna [bɔˈɡɔrja pɔfɔlˈvart͡ʂna] is a village in the administrative district of Gmina Zduny, within Łowicz County, Łódź Voivodeship, in central Poland.
