= Gmina Zduny, Łódź Voivodeship =

Gmina Zduny Zduny Commune
- Gmina
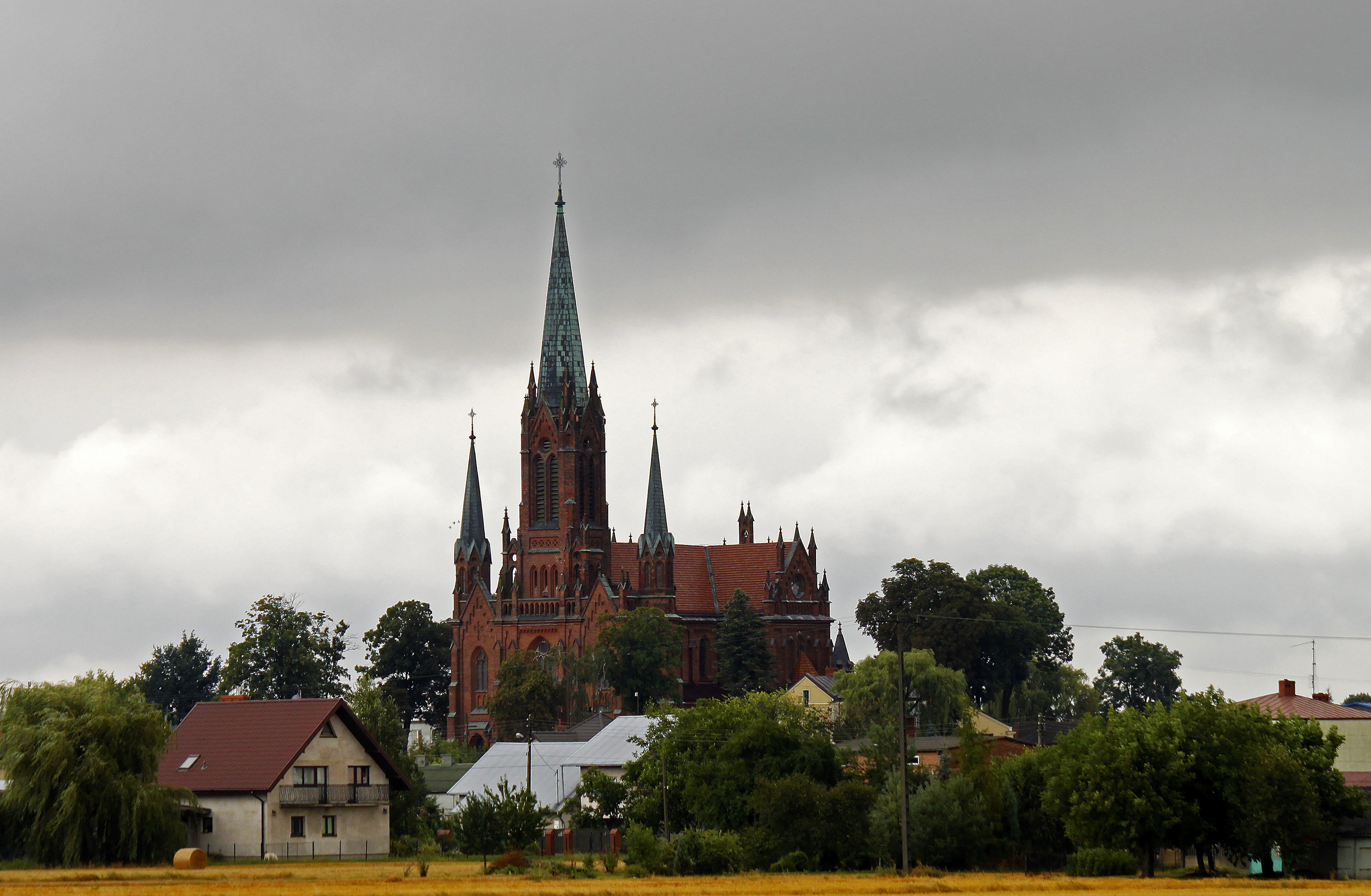

- Coat of arms
- Interactive map of Gmina Zduny
- Coordinates (Zduny): 52°8′50″N 19°48′40″E
- Country: Poland
- Voivodeship: Łódź
- County: Łowicz
- Seat: Zduny

Area
  - Total: 128.53 km^{2} (49.63 sq mi)

Population (2018)
  - Total: 5,693
  - Density: 44.29/km^{2} (114.7/sq mi)
- Website: www.gminazduny.pl

Gmina Zduny is a rural gmina (administrative district) in Łowicz County, Łódź Voivodeship, in central Poland. Its seat is the village of Zduny, which lies approximately 10 kilometres (6 mi) north-west of Łowicz and 47 km (29 mi) north-east of the regional capital Łódź.

The gmina covers an area of 128.53 square kilometres (49.6 sq mi), and as of 2006 its total population is 6,098.

== Villages ==
Gmina Zduny contains the villages and settlements of:

- Bąków Dolny
- Bąków Górny
- Bogoria Dolna
- Bogoria Górna
- Bogoria Pofolwarczna
- Dąbrowa
- Jackowice
- Łaźniki
- Maurzyce
- Nowy Złaków
- Pólka
- Retki
- Rząśno
- Strugienice
- Szymanowice
- Urzecze
- Wierznowice
- Wiskienica Dolna
- Wiskienica Górna
- Zalesie
- Zduny
- Złaków Borowy
- Złaków Kościelny

== Neighbouring gminas ==
Gmina Zduny is bordered by the gminas of Bedlno, Bielawy, Chąśno, Kiernozia, Łowicz and Żychlin.
