= Łaguszew =

- Village
- Location within Poland
- Coordinates: 52°9′N 19°58′E
- Country: Poland
- Voivodeship: (Łódź Voivodeship) Łódź
- County: Łowicz
- Gmina: Kocierzew Południowy

Łaguszew [waˈɡuʂɛf] is a village in the administrative district of Gmina Kocierzew Południowy, within Łowicz County, Łódź Voivodeship, in central Poland.
