= Kocierzew Południowy =

- Village
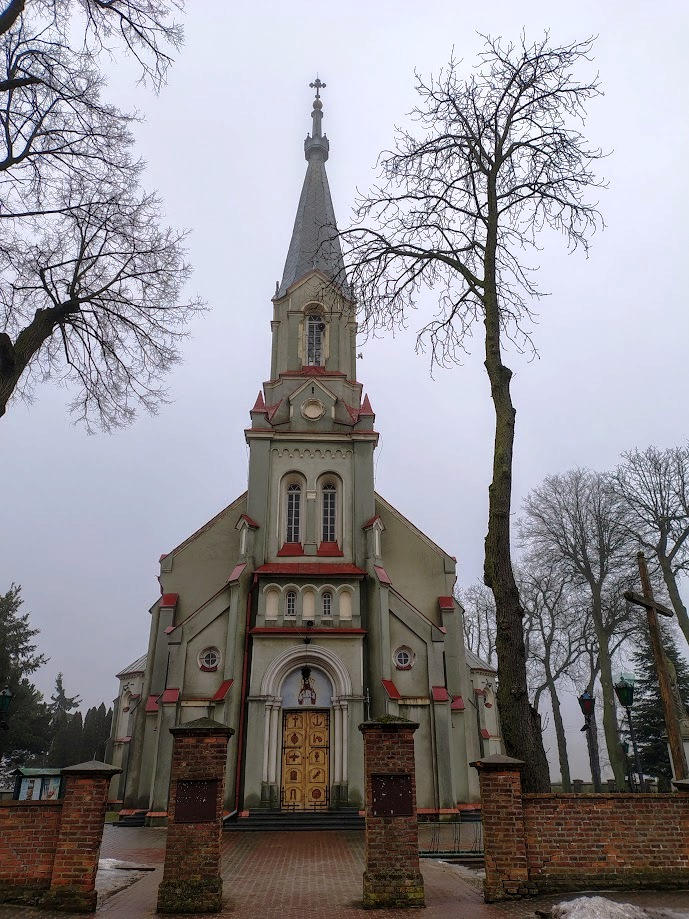
- Church of Saint Lawrence

- Location within Poland
- Coordinates: 52°13′N 20°1′E
- Country: Poland
- Voivodeship: Łódź
- County: Łowicz
- Gmina: Kocierzew Południowy
- Elevation: 100 m (330 ft)

Population
  - Total: 395
- Postal Code: 99-414
- Number Zone: (+48) 46
- Vehicle registration: ELC

Kocierzew Południowy [kɔˈt͡ɕɛʐɛf pɔwudˈɲɔvɨ] is a village in Łowicz County, Łódź Voivodeship, in central Poland. It is the seat of the gmina (administrative district) called Gmina Kocierzew Południowy.
