= Łowiczans =

Ksinzoki (Księżak dialect of Polish)
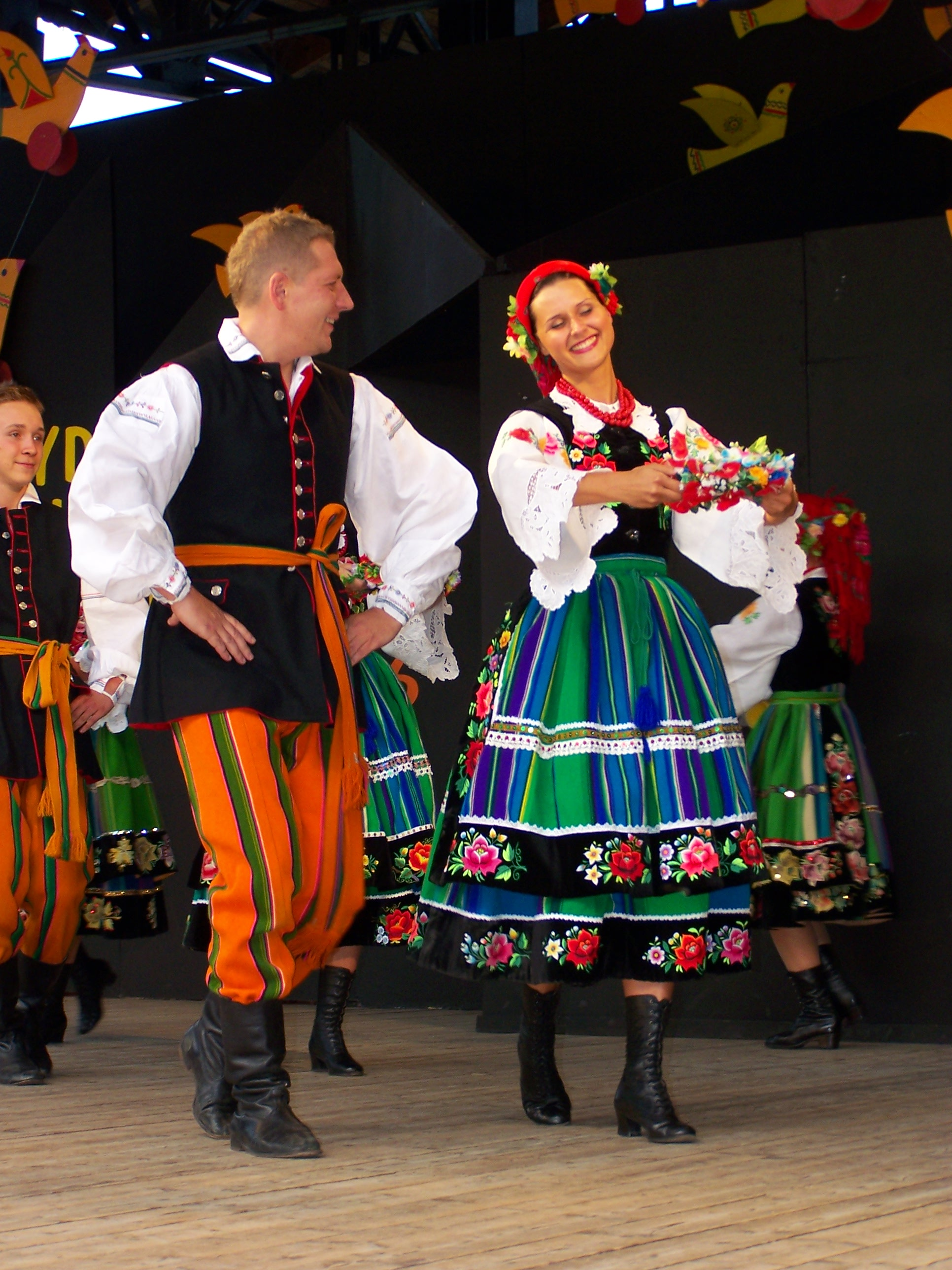
- Traditional księżak clothing

Regions with significant populations
- Poland (Duchy of Łowicz)

Languages
- Polish (Masovian dialect group, Łowicz dialect)

Religion
- Roman Catholicism

Related ethnic groups
- Poles, Masovians

Łowiczans (Polish: Łowiczanie) also known as the Łowicz Księżaks (Polish: Księżacy łowiccy, literally "Łowicz Duchy folk"; singular: Księżak łowicki) is an ethnographic group of Polish people, that are part of the ethnographic subgroup of Masovians. They originate from the historical region known as the Duchy of Łowicz (Księstwo łowickie) around the cities of Łowicz and Skierniewice in south-western Masovia, located within borders of the Łódź Voivodeship, Poland. The group speaks the Łowicz dialect of the Masovian dialect group of Polish.

== History ==
The group originates from the south west Masovia, located within borders of the Łódź Voivodeship, Poland. Historically, that area was part of the region known as Księstwo łowickie, a private estate of the Roman Catholic Archdiocese of Gniezno and the historical name derives from the Polish word "książę", which in this context did not mean "duke", but a respectful appellation to the local archbishop. The area had become an actual duchy when emperor Alexander I of Russia gave Księstwo łowickie into the ownership of Joanna Grudzińska, the second wife of Grand Duke Constantine Pavlovich of Russia, and endowed her with the title "Princess of Łowicz" (Russian: Её Светлость княгиня Лович).

The group had enjoyed more freedoms than the neighboring people, and this contributed to them developing a separate identity. They also were freed from the serfdom much earlier than other groups in the region, further building their cultural identity separate from the other groups.

== See also ==
- Media related to Folk costumes of Łowicz region at Wikimedia Commons
