= Wiskienica Dolna =

- Village
- Location within Poland
- Coordinates: 52°11′54″N 19°43′43″E
- Country: Poland
- Voivodeship: Łódź
- County: Łowicz
- Gmina: Zduny

Wiskienica Dolna [viskʲɛˈnit͡sa ˈdɔlna] is a village in the administrative district of Gmina Zduny, within Łowicz County, Łódź Voivodeship, in central Poland.
