= Gmina Kocierzew Południowy =

Gmina Kocierzew Południowy Kocierzew Południowy Commune
- Gmina
- Flag Coat of arms
- Interactive map of Gmina Kocierzew Południowy
- Coordinates (Kocierzew Południowy): 52°13′N 20°1′E
- Country: Poland
- Voivodeship: Łódź
- County: Łowicz
- Seat: Kocierzew Południowy

Area
  - Total: 93.54 km^{2} (36.12 sq mi)

Population (2006)
  - Total: 4,696
  - Density: 50.20/km^{2} (130.0/sq mi)
- Time zone: UTC+1 (CET)
  - Summer (DST): UTC+2 (CEST)
- Website: www.kocierzewpoludniowy.pl

Gmina Kocierzew Południowy is a rural gmina (administrative district) in Łowicz County, Łódź Voivodeship, in central Poland. Its seat is the village of Kocierzew Południowy ("South Kocierzew").

The gmina covers an area of 93.54 square kilometres (36.1 sq mi), and as of 2006 its total population is 4,696.

== Villages ==
Gmina Kocierzew Południowy contains the villages and settlements of:

- Boczki
- Gągolin Północny
- Gągolin Południowy
- Gągolin Zachodni
- Jeziorko
- Kocierzew Północny
- Kocierzew Południowy
- Konstantynów
- Łaguszew
- Lenartów
- Lipnice
- Osiek
- Ostrowiec
- Płaskocin
- Różyce
- Różyce-Żurawieniec
- Sromów
- Wejsce
- Wicie

== Neighbouring gminas ==
Gmina Kocierzew Południowy is bordered by the gminas of Chąśno, Iłów, Kiernozia, Łowicz, Nieborów, Nowa Sucha and Rybno.
