= Nowy Złaków =

Village in Gmina Zduny, Poland

- Village
- Location within Poland
- Coordinates: 52°12′52″N 19°48′41″E
- Country: Poland
- Voivodeship: Łódź
- County: Łowicz
- Gmina: Zduny

Nowy Złaków [ˈnɔvɨ ˈzwakuf] is a village in the administrative district of Gmina Zduny, within Łowicz County, Łódź Voivodeship, in central Poland.
