= Wejsce =

- Village
- Location within Poland
- Coordinates: 52°16′N 19°59′E
- Country: Poland
- Voivodeship: Łódź
- County: Łowicz
- Gmina: Kocierzew Południowy
- Number Zone: (+48) 46
- Vehicle registration: ELC

Wejsce [ˈvɛi̯st͡sɛ] is a village in the administrative district of Gmina Kocierzew Południowy, within Łowicz County, Łódź Voivodeship, in central Poland.
