= Różyce-Żurawieniec =

- Village
- Location within Poland
- Coordinates: 52°12′56″N 19°58′15″E
- Country: Poland
- Voivodeship: Łódź
- County: Łowicz
- Gmina: Kocierzew Południowy

Różyce-Żurawieniec [ruˈʐɨt͡sɛ ʐuraˈvjɛɲɛt͡s] is a village in the administrative district of Gmina Kocierzew Południowy, within Łowicz County, Łódź Voivodeship, in central Poland.
