= Ostrowiec, Łódź Voivodeship =

Village in Gmina Kocierzew Południowy, Poland

Ostrowiec
- Village
- Location within Poland
- Coordinates: 52°09′36″N 20°03′23″E
- Country: Poland
- Voivodeship: Łódź
- County: Łowicz
- Gmina: Kocierzew Południowy

Ostrowiec [ɔsˈtrɔvjɛt͡s] is a village in the administrative district of Gmina Kocierzew Południowy, within Łowicz County, Łódź Voivodeship, in central Poland.
