= Pavel Malcharek =

Czech footballer (born 1986)

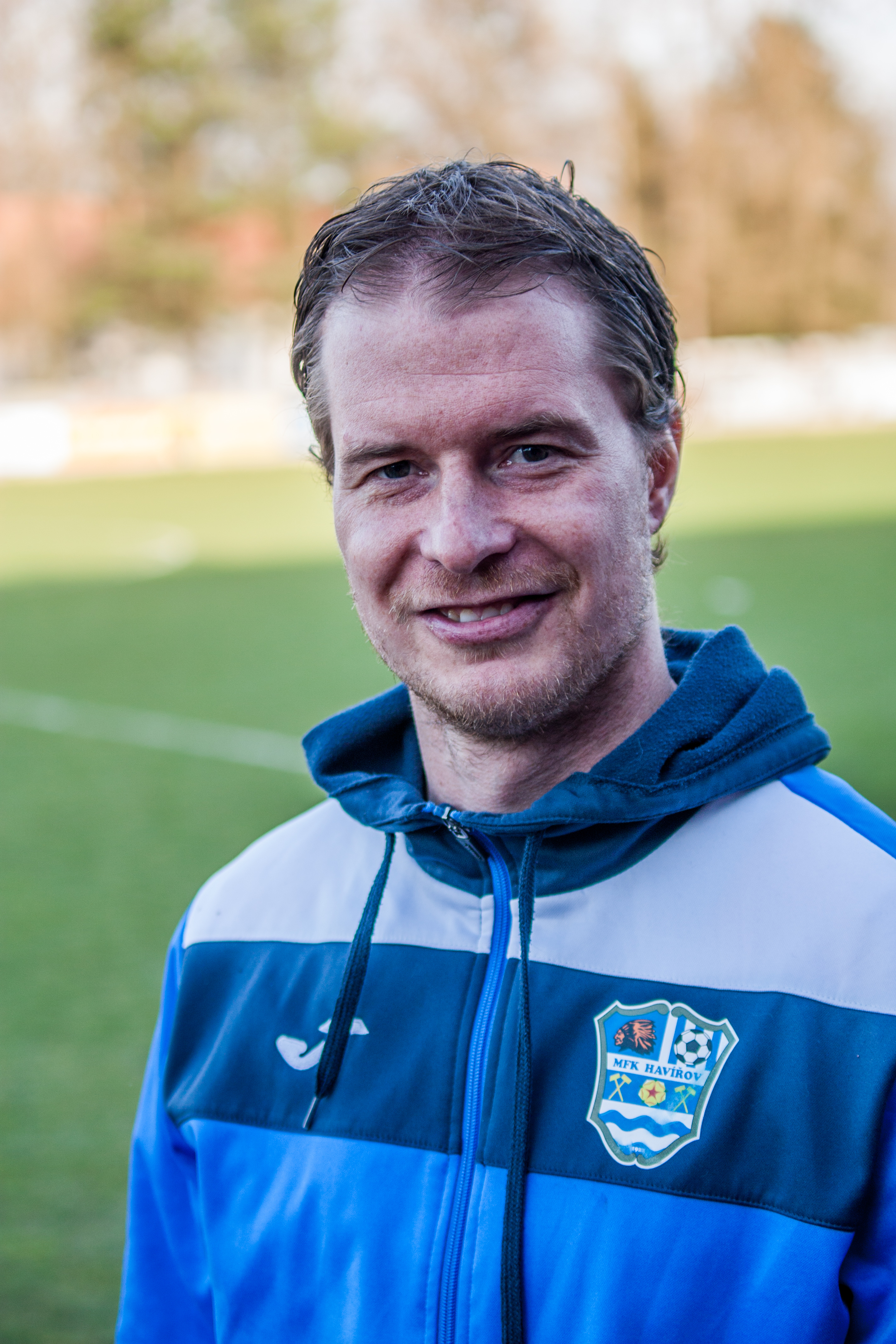

Personal information
- Full name: Pavel Malcharek
- Date of birth: 16 February 1986 (age 40)
- Place of birth: Ostrava, Czechoslovakia
- Height: 1.83 m (6 ft 0 in)
- Position: Forward

Team information
- Current team: MFK Havířov (assistant)

Youth career
- 1993–2002: Vítkovice

Senior career*
Years	Team	Apps	(Gls)
2002–2004	Vítkovice	48	(7)
2004–2005	Sparta Prague	35	(8)
2005–2007	Slovácko	27	(1)
2007–2008	Viktoria Plzeň	38	(0)
2008–2011	Tescoma Zlín	45	(2)
2011	Spartak Trnava	5	(0)
2011	→ Baník Ostrava (loan)	7	(0)
2012–2014	Tescoma Zlín	52	(11)
2014–2016	Fotbal Třinec	46	(12)
2016–2017	Rohrendorf	17	(11)
2017–2018	Parndorf	19	(5)
2018	Markt Allhau	9	(2)
2018–2019	Rohrendorf	14	(5)
2020–2022	MFK Havířov		

International career
2001	Czech Republic U-16	3	(4)
2002–2003	Czech Republic U-17	20	(10)
2003–2005	Czech Republic U-19	24	(7)
2006	Czech Republic U-21	1	(0)

Managerial career
- 2022–: MFK Havířov (assistant)
- * Club domestic league appearances and goals

Pavel Malcharek (born 16 February 1986) is a retired Czech footballer, who played as a forward. He is currently the assistant coach of Czech club MFK Havířov.

== Playing career ==
Malcharek started his football career in his native Ostrava at Vítkovice. At the age of 16 he already played the Second League for Vítkovice. Eventually he moved to the top Czech club, Sparta Prague but was not able to break to the first squad and was transferred to Slovácko. Malcharek eventually played for Viktoria Plzeň and recently played at Tescoma Zlín. In June 2011 he has joined Spartak Trnava.

Malcharek was a member of Czech Republic youth national teams since the under-16 level.

=== Later career ===
After a few years in Austria, Malcharek moved back to the Czech Republic, signing for MFK Havířov. From the beginning of 2022–23, Malcharek served as a playing assistant coach for the club. In March 2023, he was also named president of the club.

As of January 2024, Malcharek was still working at Havířov as an assistant coach.
