= Bąków Górny =

- Village
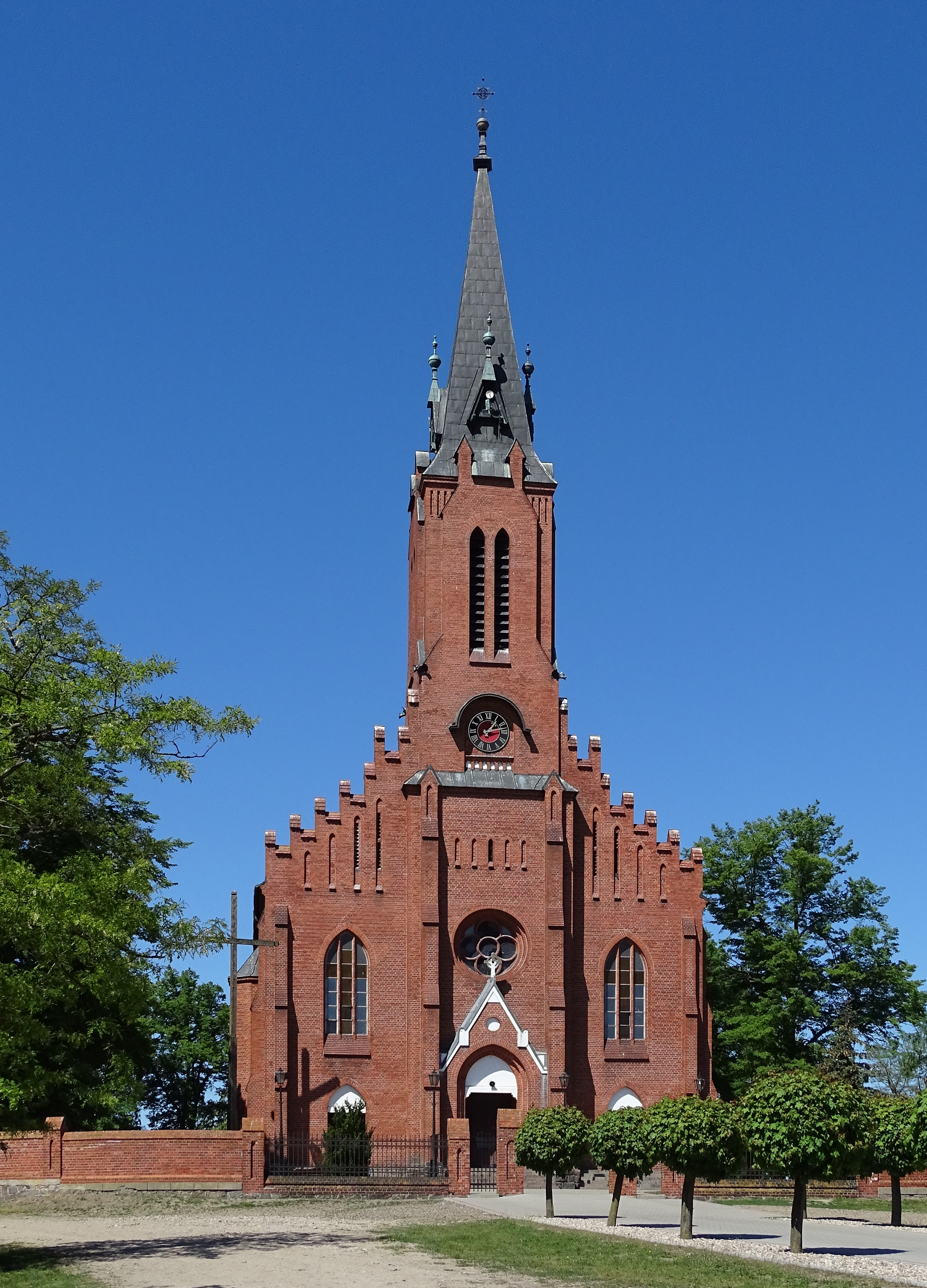
- Saint Nicholas church in Bąków Górny

- Location within Poland
- Coordinates: 52°9′N 19°44′E
- Country: Poland
- Voivodeship: Łódź
- County: Łowicz
- Gmina: Zduny
- Time zone: UTC+1 (CET)
  - Summer (DST): UTC+2 (CEST)

Bąków Górny [ˈbɔŋkuf ˈɡurnɨ] is a village in the administrative district of Gmina Zduny, within Łowicz County, Łódź Voivodeship, in central Poland.

During the German invasion of Poland, which started World War II, on September 17, 1939, Wehrmacht troops murdered 18 Poles from Bąków Górny, including eight women and three children (see also Nazi crimes against the Polish nation).
