= Złaków Kościelny =

- Village
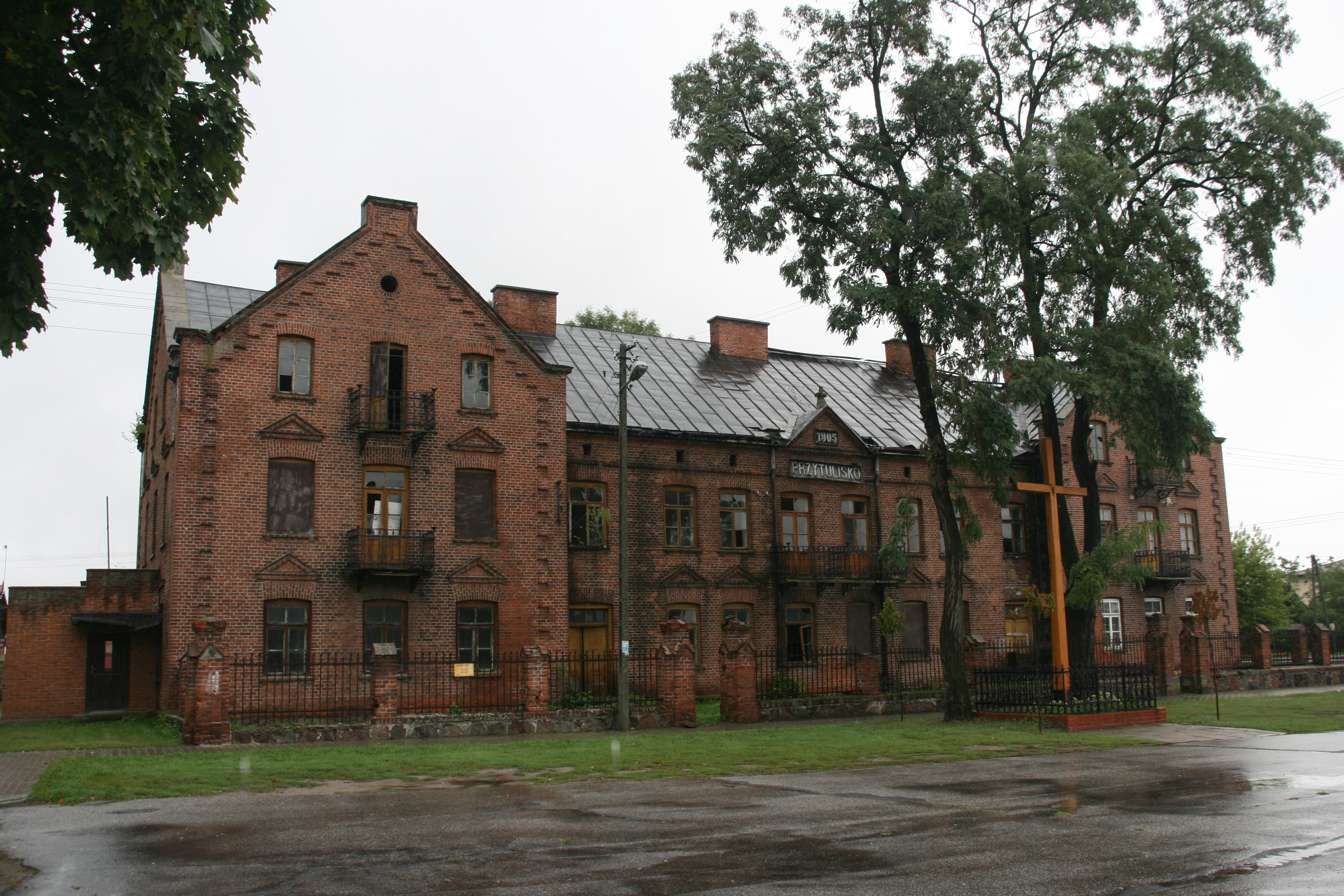

- Location within Poland
- Coordinates: 52°11′53″N 19°48′43″E
- Country: Poland
- Voivodeship: Łódź
- County: Łowicz
- Gmina: Zduny

Złaków Kościelny [ˈzwakuf kɔɕˈt͡ɕɛlnɨ] is a village in the administrative district of Gmina Zduny, within Łowicz County, Łódź Voivodeship, in central Poland.
