= Duchy of Łowicz =

Historical and cultural region in Poland

Księstwo Łowickie
- 1820–1918 (as an official entity under the name Duchy of Łowicz)
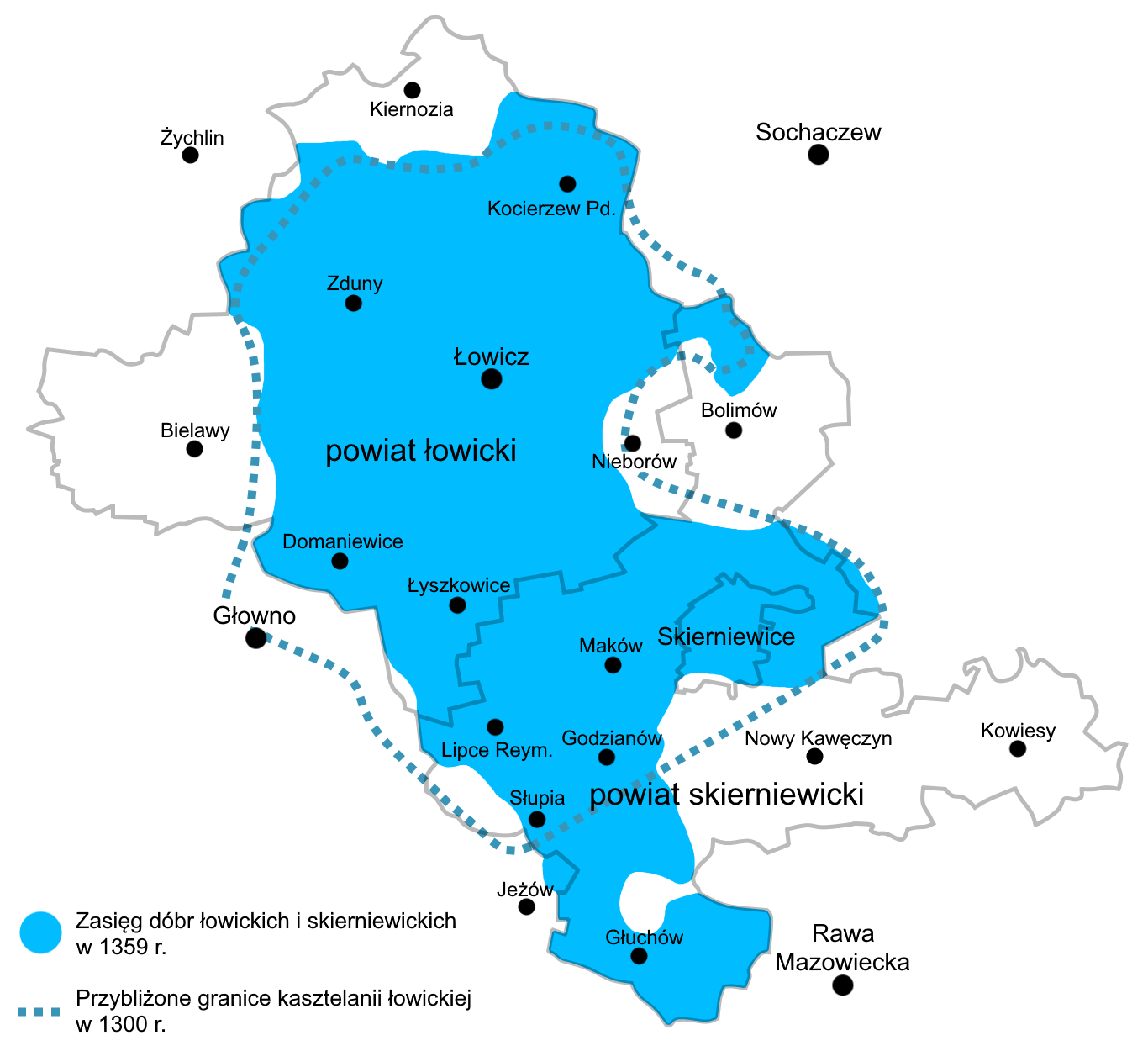
- location on the map of the contemporary Łowicz and Skierniewice counties
- Capital: Łowicz
- Demonym: Księżaks
- History
  - Established: 1820
  - Disestablished: 1918 (as an official entity under the name Duchy of Łowicz)
- Today part of: Poland

The Duchy of Łowicz (Polish: Księstwo Łowickie Russian: Ловичское княжество, Księżak dialect: Ksinstwo) is a historical region in Poland, located in south-western Masovia, in the basin of the Bzura River, around the towns of Łowicz and Skierniewice. From the early Middle Ages until the partitions of the Polish–Lithuanian Commonwealth it was an estate of the Roman Catholic archbishopric of Gniezno. In the 19th century it belonged to the Russian tsars.

The Duchy of Łowicz retains its identity of a separate historical and cultural region inhabited by the ethnic group of Księżaks (Łowiczans) who speak the Księżak dialect of the Polish language. Their cultural distinctiveness is a result of the centuries long affiliation with the land estate.

== History ==
The Łowicz castellany, existing since the early Middle Ages, was originally a complex of estates of the archbishops of Gniezno, stretching around Łowicz, confirmed as part of the endowment of the Gniezno archbishopric as early as 1136. Rapid development of settlement in its area took place only in the 14th century during the reign of the archbishops Janisław and Jarosław Bogoria of Skotniki.

In 1795, after the third partition of the Polish–Lithuanian Commonwealth, the Duchy of Łowicz was seized by the Prussian authorities, and subsequently by Napoleon (1806), who donated it to the marshal of France Louis Davout (1807). In 1815 it became a property of the government of the Kingdom of Poland, and in 1820 it was granted by Tsar Alexander I to Grand Duke Constantine and his wife Joanna Grudzińska (the Duchess of Łowicz).

In 1838, the inhabitants of the Duchy of Łowicz were emancipated as one of the first groups of peasants in the country. The arable land allotments granted to the Księżak peasants at that time ranged from 30 to 50 morgas; communal pastures also came under the ownership of the village communities. The abolition of serfdom and granting land to the Księżaks contributed to a significant increase in their wealth and the development of their rich material culture in the second half of the 19th century. As a result of the popularization of sheep breeding, the modern Księżak clothing was formed at that time.

From 1838 until World War I, the duchy remained the direct property of the tsars, who often organized large-scale hunts in the area. For this purpose, by decree of the tsar, a menagerie and a pheasantry were established in the forests of the duchy (Zwierzyniec and Bażantarnia in the present-day commune of Maków), where game was bred. By the end of the 19th century, this menagerie housed approximately 500 fallow deer, 30 red deer, and approximately 500 pheasants.

The duchy existed until 1918, when the Second Polish Republic was established. After that, the name Duchy of Łowicz remained in use, but from then it has a purely historical and cultural character.
