= Gągolin Zachodni =

- Village
- Location within Poland
- Coordinates: 52°11′N 20°3′E
- Country: Poland
- Voivodeship: Łódź
- County: Łowicz
- Gmina: Kocierzew Południowy

Gągolin Zachodni [ɡɔnˈɡɔlin zaˈxɔdni] is a village in the administrative district of Gmina Kocierzew Południowy, within Łowicz County, Łódź Voivodeship, in central Poland.
