= Retki =

- Village
- Location within Poland
- Coordinates: 52°10′N 19°50′E
- Country: Poland
- Voivodeship: Łódź
- County: Łowicz
- Gmina: Zduny
- Time zone: UTC+1 (CET)
  - Summer (DST): UTC+2 (CEST)
- Vehicle registration: ELC

Retki [ˈrɛtki] is a village in the administrative district of Gmina Zduny, within Łowicz County, Łódź Voivodeship, in central Poland. It is located within the historical region of Mazovia.

== History ==
Retki was a private church village within the Kingdom of Poland, administratively located in the Rawa Voivodeship in the Greater Poland Province, owned by the Archdiocese of Gniezno.

During the invasion of Poland, which started World War II, on 16 September 1939, Germans murdered 22 Poles in Retki, including nine farmers from Retki and 13 refugees from the nearby town of Zgierz (see also Nazi crimes against the Polish nation).
