= Kocierzew Północny =

- Village
- Location within Poland
- Coordinates: 52°13′55″N 20°01′27″E
- Country: Poland
- Voivodeship: Łódź
- County: Łowicz
- Gmina: Kocierzew Południowy

Kocierzew Północny [kɔˈt͡ɕɛʐɛf puu̯ˈnɔt͡snɨ] is a village in the administrative district of Gmina Kocierzew Południowy, within Łowicz County, Łódź Voivodeship, in central Poland.
