= Szymanowice, Łódź Voivodeship =

Village in Poland

Szymanowice
- Village
- Location within Poland
- Coordinates: 52°9′N 19°50′E
- Country: Poland
- Voivodeship: Łódź
- County: Łowicz
- Gmina: Zduny

Szymanowice (Polish pronunciation: [ʂɨmanɔˈvit͡sɛ]) is a village in the administrative district of Gmina Zduny, within Łowicz County, Łódź Voivodeship, in central Poland.
