= Złaków Borowy =

- Village
- Location within Poland
- Coordinates: 52°13′30″N 19°48′3″E
- Country: Poland
- Voivodeship: Łódź
- County: Łowicz
- Gmina: Zduny
- Population: 548

Złaków Borowy [ˈzwakuf bɔˈrɔvɨ] is a village in the administrative district of Gmina Zduny, within Łowicz County, Łódź Voivodeship, in central Poland.
