= Zduny, Łowicz County =

Zduny
- Village
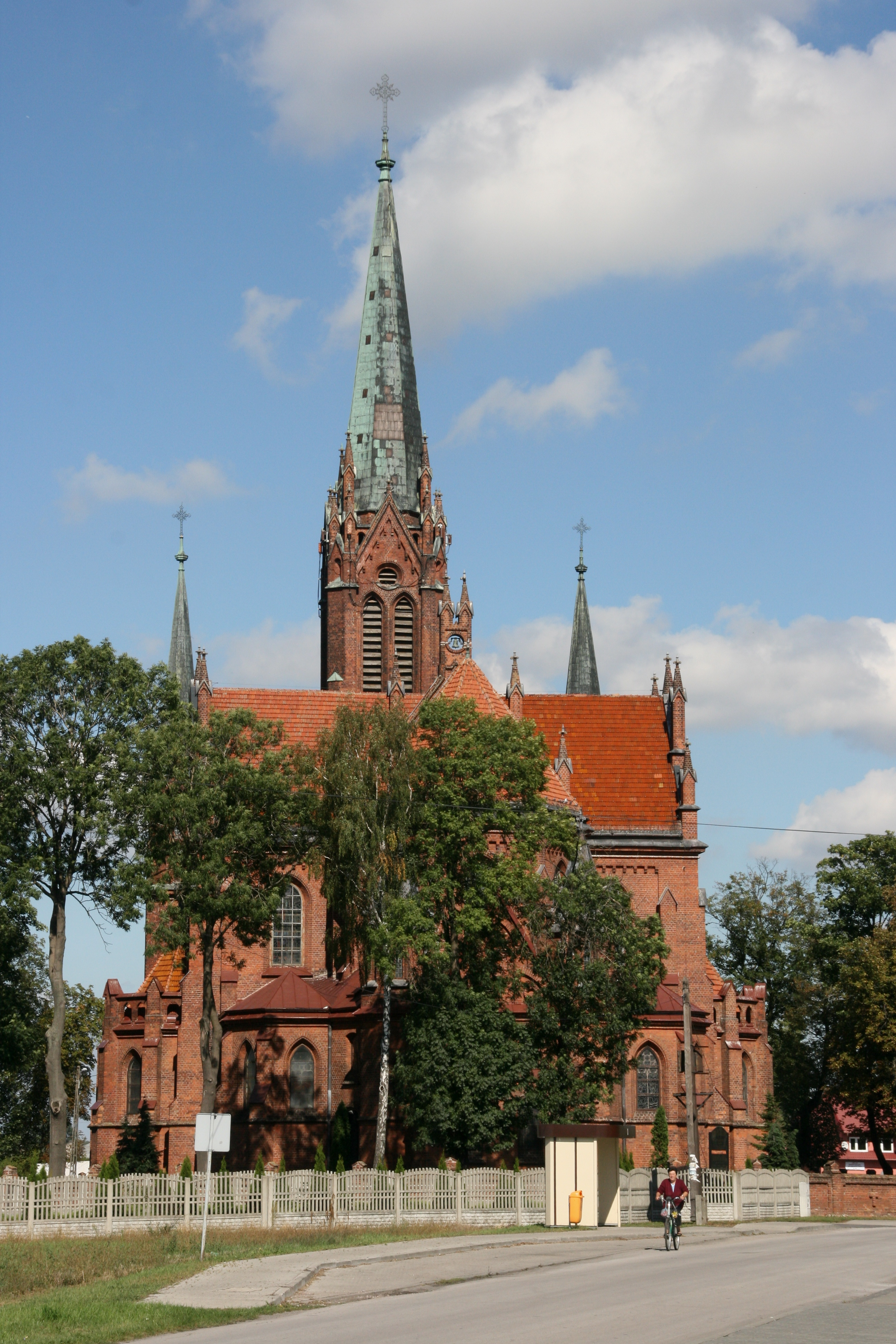
- Church of Saint James, the Apostle

- Location within Poland
- Coordinates: 52°8′50″N 19°48′40″E
- Country: Poland
- Voivodeship: Łódź
- County: Łowicz
- Gmina: Zduny

Population
  - Total: 693

Zduny [ˈzdunɨ] is a village in Łowicz County, Łódź Voivodeship, in central Poland. It is the seat of the gmina (administrative district) called Gmina Zduny.
