= Wicie, Łódź Voivodeship =

Wicie
- Village
- Location within Poland
- Coordinates: 52°11′50″N 20°00′35″E
- Country: Poland
- Voivodeship: Łódź
- County: Łowicz
- Gmina: Kocierzew Południowy

Wicie [ˈvit͡ɕɛ] is a village in the administrative district of Gmina Kocierzew Południowy, within Łowicz County, Łódź Voivodeship, in central Poland.
