= Pólka, Łódź Voivodeship =

Village in Gmina Zduny, Poland

Pólka
- Village
- Location within Poland
- Coordinates: 52°09′47″N 19°49′32″E
- Country: Poland
- Voivodeship: Łódź
- County: Łowicz
- Gmina: Zduny

Pólka [ˈpulka] is a village in the administrative district of Gmina Zduny, within Łowicz County, Łódź Voivodeship, in central Poland.
