= Lipnice =

- Village
- Location within Poland
- Coordinates: 52°13′56″N 20°03′56″E
- Country: Poland
- Voivodeship: Łódź
- County: Łowicz
- Gmina: Kocierzew Południowy

Lipnice (Polish pronunciation: [lipˈɲit͡sɛ]) is a village in the administrative district of Gmina Kocierzew Południowy, within Łowicz County, Łódź Voivodeship, in central Poland.
