= Kreis Adelnau =

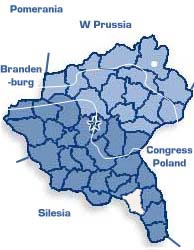

Kreis Adelnau (Polish: Powiat odolanowski) was a county in the southern administrative district of Posen, in the Prussian province of Posen.

== Military command ==
Kreis Adelnau was part of the military command (German: Bezirkskommando) in Posen at Ostrowo.

== Court system ==
The main court (German: Landgericht) was in Ostrowo, with lower courts (German: Amtsgericht) in Aldenau and Ostrowo.

== Civil registry offices ==
In 1905, these civil registry offices (German: Standesamt) served the following towns in Kreis Adelnau:

- Adelnau
- Klein Topola
- Raschkow
- Danischen
- Ludwikow
- Sulmierzyce

== Police districts ==
In 1905, these police districts (German: Polizeidistrikt) served towns in Kreis Adelnau:

- Adelnau
- Adelnau West
- Schwarzwald
- Adelnau Ost
- Raschkow
- Sulmierzyce

== Catholic churches ==
In 1905, these Catholic parish churches served towns in Kreis Adelnau:

- Adelnau
- Kotlow
- Ostrowo
- Raschkow
- Skrzebow
- Szczury
- Hanswalde
- Lewkow
- Pogrzybow
- Schildberg
- Sulmierzyce

== Protestant churches ==
In 1905, Protestant parish churches served towns in Kreis Adelnau:

- Adelnau
- Krotoschin
- Ostrowo
- Raschkow
- Schwarzwald
