= Leszek Berger =

Polish biologist, malacologist and herpetologist

Leszek Berger (February 10, 1925 – July 8, 2012) was a Polish biologist, specialist in malacology and herpetology, discoverer of hybridogenesis in amphibians. And did of research on amphibians and reptiles in Southern Wielkopolska, a long-time employee of the Polish Academy of Sciences.

== Family and Education ==
Leszek Berger was born in Pabianice, in his mother's hometown. He spent his childhood and youth with his family, first in Lewkowiec near Ostrów Wielkopolski and in Ostrów itself. He began his education in a four-grade primary school in the neighboring village of Franklinów. After completing the third grade, his parents enrolled him in the seven-grade Ewaryst Estkowski Primary School in Ostrów Wielkopolski. In 1947, Berger graduated from the then Male High School in Ostrów Wielkopolski.

== Career ==
Throughout his research career, Berger took extensive notes on all of the innumerable crosses that he made among water frogs. This, together with his sharp eye for details of frogs as living organisms, enabled him to make striking discoveries about the evolutionary biology of water frogs before the advent of molecular evolution and with minimal statistical training. As a result of numerous crosses and backcrosses involving the species around Poznan, he demonstrated that the edible frog Pelophylax esculentus was not a distinct Mendelian species but rather an interspecies hybrid between the pool frog P. lessonae and the marsh frog P. ridibundus; and that P. esculentus persists through backcrosses with one of the parental species, P. lessonae (Berger 1964, 1967, 1968). This distinctive reproductive system, termed hybridogenesis, (Schultz 1969) was otherwise known only in fresh-water fishes of the genus Poeciliopsis, which are primarily Mexican and Central American. In hybridogenetic reproduction, gametes of the hybrid lineage normally contain complete genomes of only one parental species, in this case usually P. ridibundus, (the other is eliminated from the genome prior to meiosis). Matings between hybrids and P. lessonae restore hybridity in the subsequent generation. The Pelophylax hybridogenetic complex is unusual in that both male and female hybrids occur. Although Prof. Berger's resolution of the relationships of Central European water frogs is his earliest and best-known contribution to the evolutionary status of water frogs, many other details have emerged in following decades. Prof. Berger's observation (associated with the numerous laboratory crosses that he made) that P. esculentus females frequently produce ova with distinct size classes led to examination of red blood cell sizes of adult frogs used for crosses and the discovery of abundant triploid hybrid water frogs, first in northern Poland and later in northern Germany as well. Morphological data, later confirmed by allozyme electrophoresis, suggested that triploids were present in two distinct forms, and indeed those more resembling marsh frogs contained two complete genomes of that species and one of P. lessonae; whereas those more resembling pool frogs contained two complete genomes of that species and one of P. ridibundus. Later crosses revealed the array of gametes produced by these two morphological types (Günther, Uzzell, and Berger 1979).

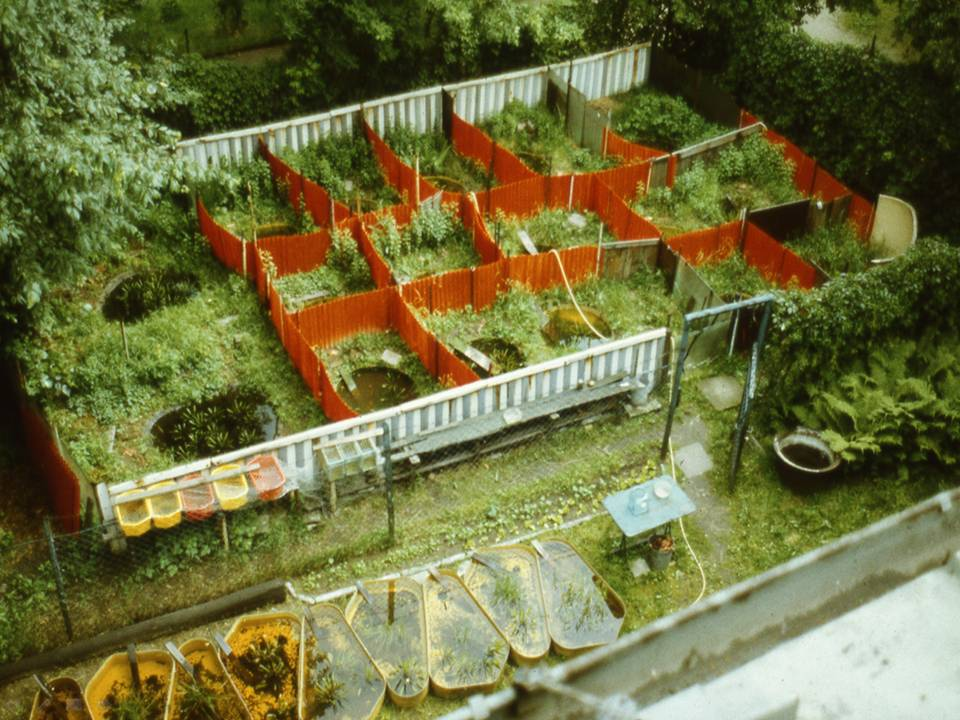
First water frogs farm built by Berger in Poznań

Utilizing the abundant data that he regularly collected over several years on three populations from near Turew, Wielkopolska (numbers of adults per kind, numbers of eggs and egg masses produced, numbers fertilized, numbers and kinds of tadpoles produced) Berger offered convincing evidence that the single all-hybrid population among the three persisted, not because of the usual matings that permit hybrid water frog lineages to persist, but only because of rare successes of fertilization involving ova with several unusual and rare genomic compositions.

== Honors ==
In 1973 Prof. Berger received the first-degree award from the Polish Academy of Science for his discovery of a new type of heredity and reproduction in one of the most common European amphibian species. Because of Berger's results, zoologists around the world have begun to study water frogs; this has resulted in discovery of several new water frog species. One of them, the former Rana bergeri Günther, 1985 (now Pelophylax bergeri), was named in his honour. Significant collaborators (5 or more publications) include Stefania Bucci (IT), Rainer Günther (GE), Elżbieta Czarniewska (PL), Hansjürg Hotz (CH), Giorgio Mancino (IT), Matilda Raghianti (IT), Mariusz Rybacki (PL), and Thomas Uzzell (USA). Today Professor Berger's research is being continued in the Department of Evolutionary Biology and Conservation of Vertebrates at the University of Wrocław (Maria Ogielska team).

In October 2013, the Leszek Berger Park of Nature Education was opened in Poznań; in June 2014, a pond in the shape of a frog was created in Raszków (near the village of Jaskółki) in honour of Professor Berger.

Over the course of 39 years (1963–2001) Prof. Berger bred and crossed all 16 taxa of western Palearctic water frogs. He obtained over 800,000 offspring from approximately 1,500 crosses, making him perhaps the most prolific scientific breeder of amphibians in the world. His publication list includes over 120 titles.

Prof. Berger died 8 July 2012 at age 87. He is buried in a cemetery near the Żurawiniec reserve in Poznań, where he began his research on amphibians.

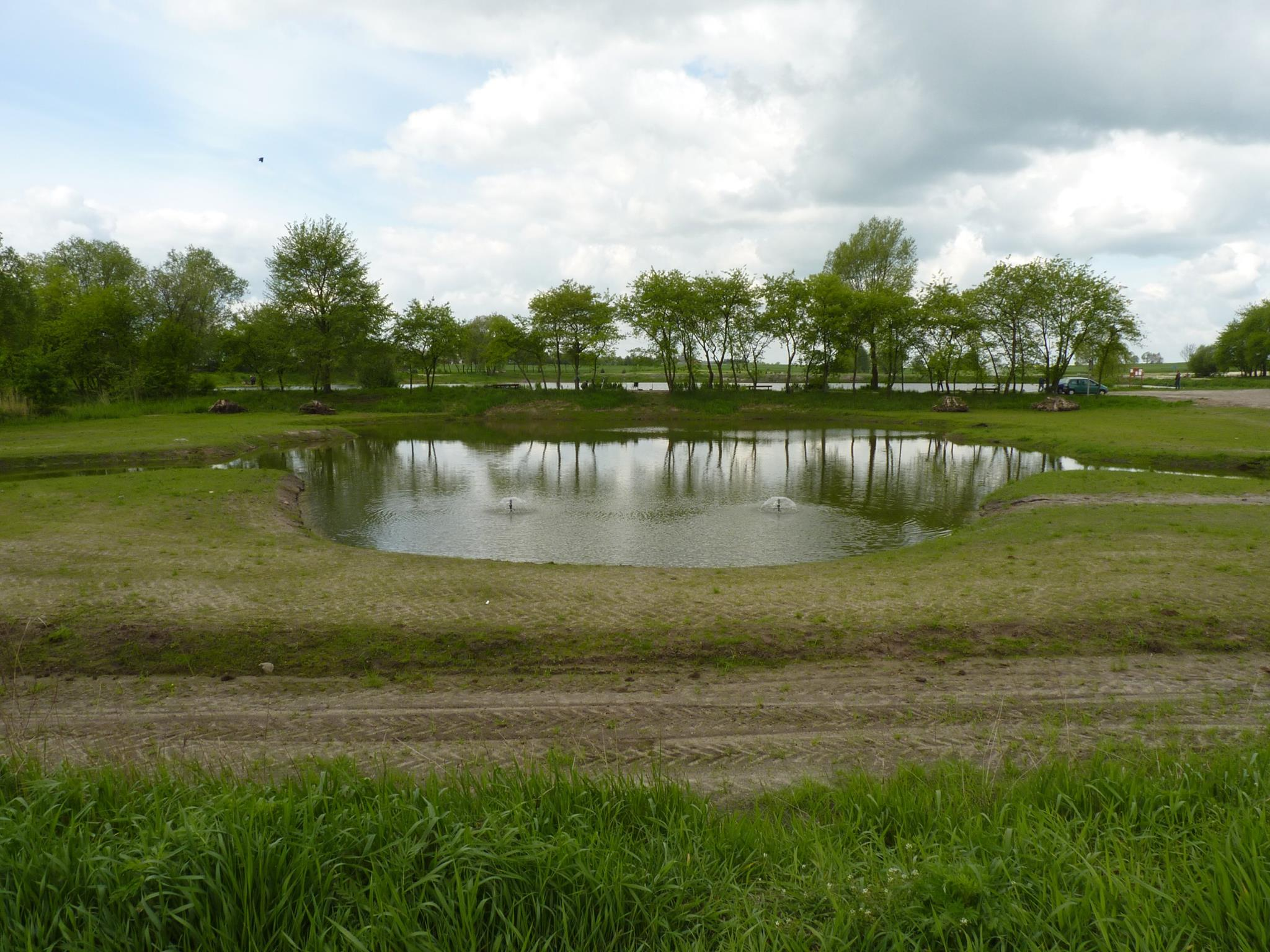
Pond in the shape of a frog
