= Rososzyca =

- Village
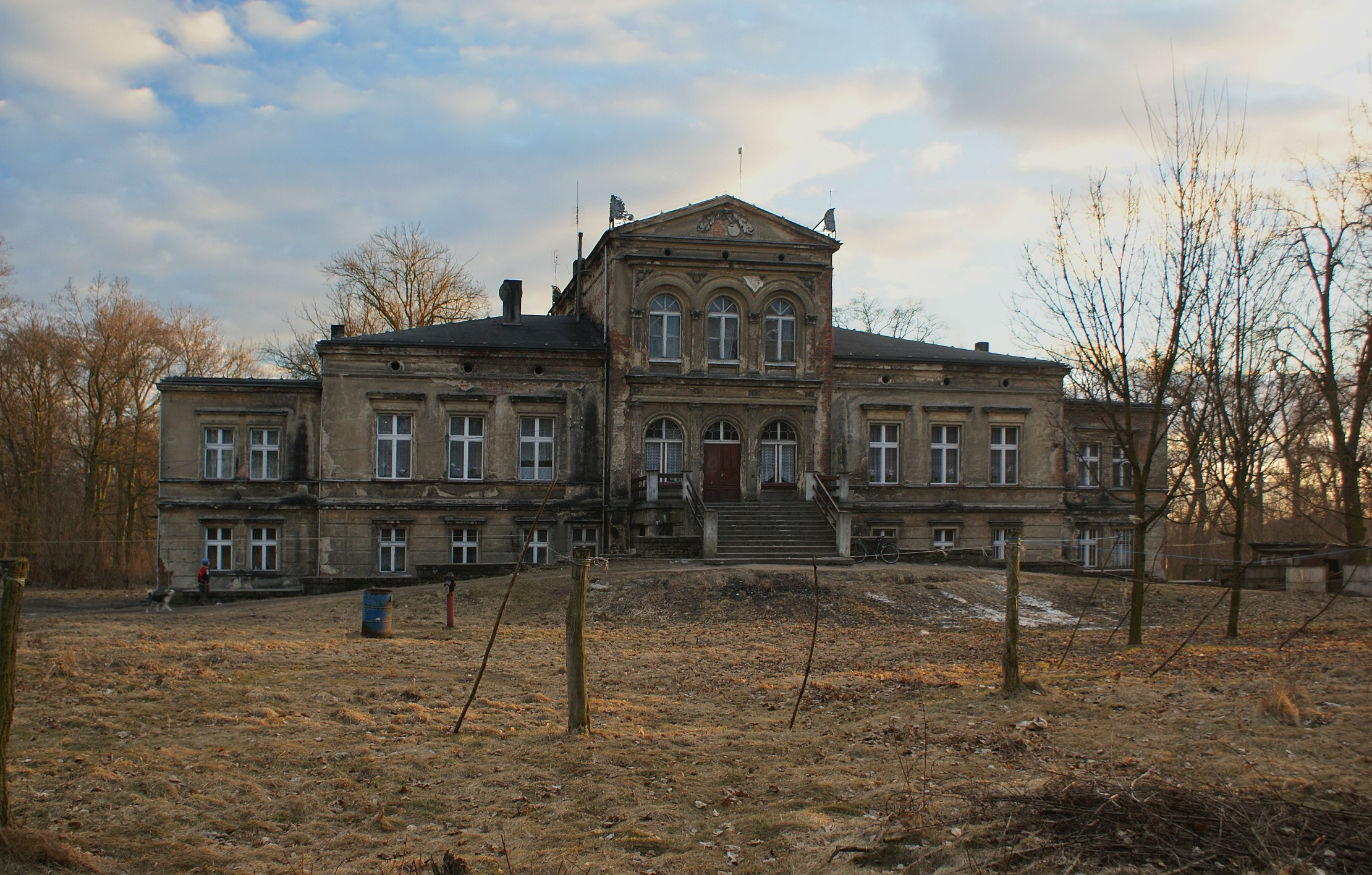
- Skórzewski Palace in Rososzyca

- Location within Poland
- Coordinates: 51°38′N 18°1′E
- Country: Poland
- Voivodeship: Greater Poland
- County: Ostrów
- Gmina: Sieroszewice
- Population (approx.): 1,000

Rososzyca [rɔsɔˈʂɨt͡sa] is a village in the administrative district of Gmina Sieroszewice, within Ostrów County, Greater Poland Voivodeship, in west-central Poland. It is situated on the edge of the valley near the mouth of the river Barycz, at an altitude of approximately 125 m. The village has an approximate population of 1,000.

== History ==
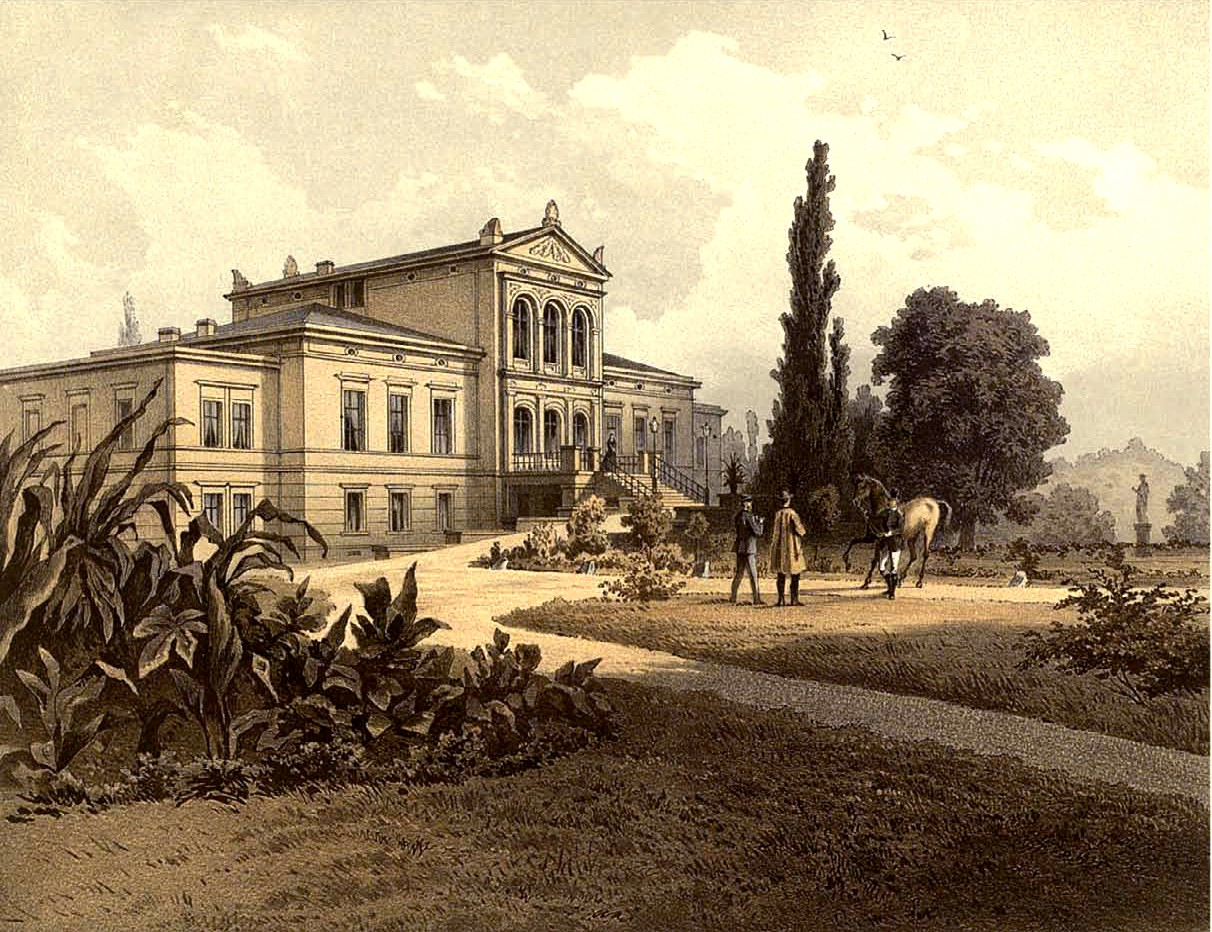
Rittergut Rossoszyca (present-day Skórzewski Palace) from the Sammlung Alexander Duncker.

First recorded in 1377AD as a village, owned by the knight, Nicholas of Dóbr Klasztoru in Ołobok. From the end of the eighteenth century until 1928 it belonged to the Skórzewski family who in the nineteenth century built a palace here. Previously, the family Roso(w)ski of the Korab coat of arms, had owned it. Before the year 1887 the village belonged administratively to the Odolanowski county; from 1887 to 1975 and since 1999 to the Ostrów County and in the years 1975-1998 it belonged directly to the Kalisz Voivodeship.

== Tourist attractions ==
- Skorzewski Palace, currently in ruins and the nearby park
- Saint Mark church from 1818
- 19th century folwark buildings, including a granary
- medieval ruins from 15-16th centuries near the palace
