= Lamki =

Village in Greater Poland Voivodeship, Poland

- Village
- Location within Poland
- Coordinates: 51°39′27″N 17°44′00″E
- Country: Poland
- Voivodeship: Greater Poland
- County: Ostrów
- Gmina: Ostrów Wielkopolski
- Population: 900

Lamki [ˈlamki] is a village in the administrative district of Gmina Ostrów Wielkopolski, within Ostrów County, Greater Poland Voivodeship, in west-central Poland.
