= Bibianki =

- Village
- Location within Poland
- Coordinates: 51°38′26″N 17°56′12″E
- Country: Poland
- Voivodeship: Greater Poland
- County: Ostrów
- Gmina: Sieroszewice
- Elevation: 140 m (460 ft)
- Population: 73

Bibianki [biˈbjanki] is a village in the administrative district of Gmina Sieroszewice, within Ostrów County, Greater Poland Voivodeship, in west-central Poland.
