= Kąkolewo =

Kąkolewo may refer to the following places in Poland:

- Kąkolewo, Gmina Grodzisk Wielkopolski in Greater Poland Voivodeship (west-central Poland)
- Kąkolewo, Leszno County in Greater Poland Voivodeship (west-central Poland)
- Kąkolewo, Gmina Ostrów Wielkopolski in Greater Poland Voivodeship (west-central Poland)
