= Nabyszyce =

- Village
- Location within Poland
- Coordinates: 51°37′39″N 17°38′27″E
- Country: Poland
- Voivodeship: Greater Poland
- County: Ostrów
- Gmina: Odolanów
- Population: 630

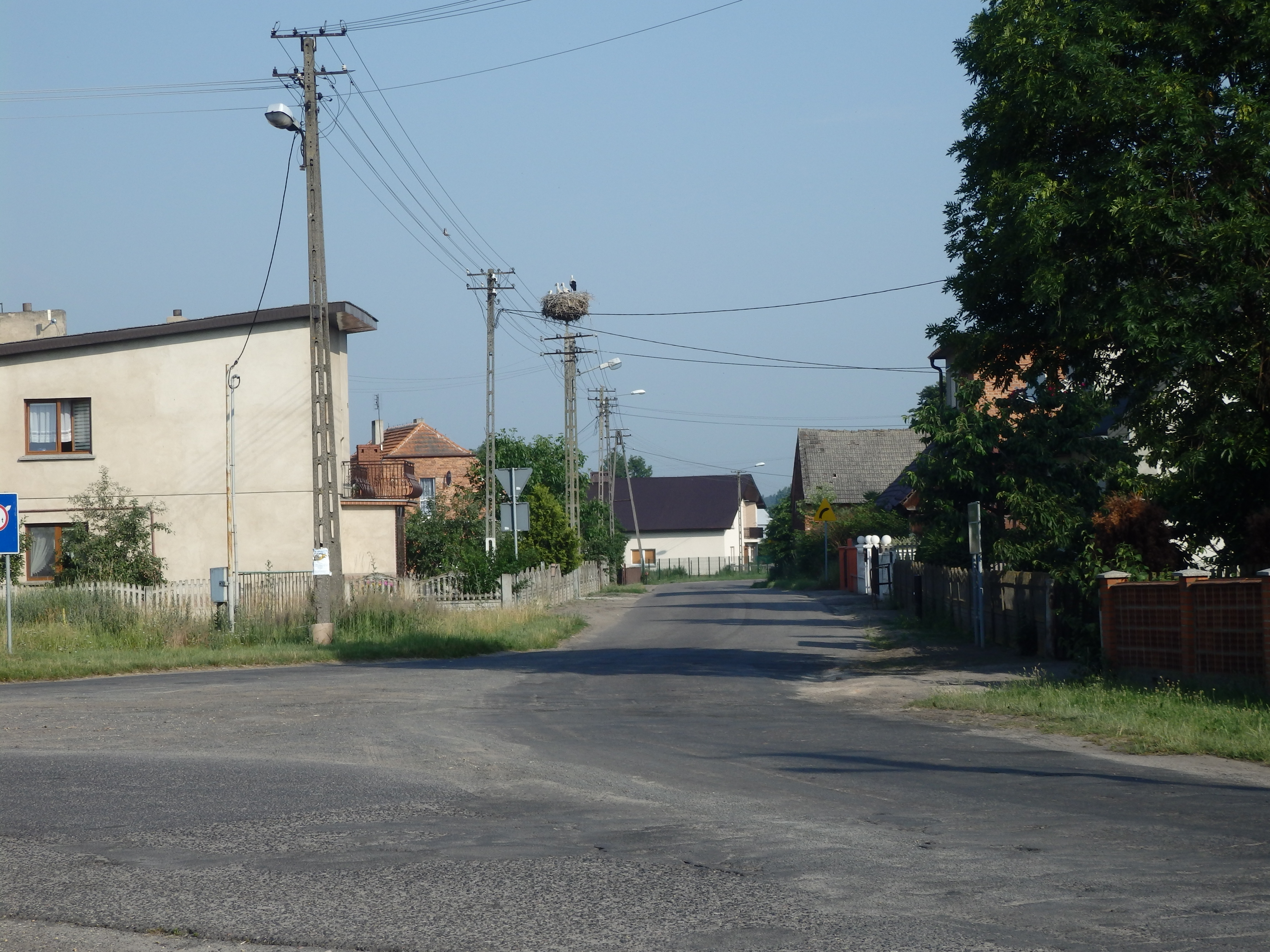
Center in Nabyszyce

Nabyszyce [nabɨˈʂɨt͡sɛ] is a village in the administrative district of Gmina Odolanów, within Ostrów County, Greater Poland Voivodeship, in west-central Poland.
