= Daniszyn =

- Village
- Location within Poland
- Coordinates: 51°39′20″N 17°38′15″E
- Country: Poland
- Voivodeship: Greater Poland
- County: Ostrów
- Gmina: Ostrów Wielkopolski
- Population: 1,200

Daniszyn [daˈniʂɨn] is a village in the administrative district of Gmina Ostrów Wielkopolski, within Ostrów County, Greater Poland Voivodeship, in west-central Poland.
