= Feldmark =

Plant community resilient to extreme winds

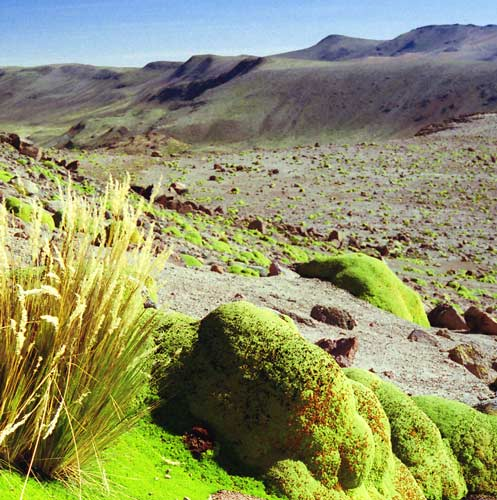
Azorella compacta, a cushion plant, growing in feldmark habitat in Peru

Feldmark, also spelt fjaeldmark (from Norwegian 'mountain field'), is a plant community characteristic of sites where plant growth is severely restricted by extremes of cold and exposure to wind, typical of alpine tundra and subantarctic environments.

== Description ==
Feldmark plant communities are characterised by scattered dwarf and prostrate plants, up to about 25 cm (10 in) in height, often with a mat or cushion habit, among patches of bare ground and exposed rock.

== Distribution ==
Feldmark occurs in the least favourable situations for plant growth, including late-lying snowdrift areas on leeward slopes and cold, highly wind-exposed ridges. Because feldmark species are adapted to cold bare ground, some are able to colonise areas of severe erosion where the topsoil has been removed, leaving only a surface of broken rock or stones. In areas with strong prevailing winds, expansion through layering on the sheltered sides of plants means that they may grow preferentially on the protected sides and gradually move downwind across the landscape.

== See also ==
- Fellfield
- Boników (formerly called Feldmark), Ostrów County, Greater Poland Voivodeship, in western Poland
