= Zalesie, Gmina Ostrów Wielkopolski =

Zalesie
- Village
- Location within Poland
- Coordinates: 51°40′05″N 17°42′51″E
- Country: Poland
- Voivodeship: Greater Poland
- County: Ostrów
- Gmina: Ostrów Wielkopolski
- Population: 76

Zalesie [zaˈlɛɕɛ] is a village in the administrative district of Gmina Ostrów Wielkopolski within Ostrów County, Greater Poland Voivodeship in west-central Poland.
