= Psary, Gmina Sieroszewice =

Psary
- Village
- Location within Poland
- Coordinates: 51°39′N 18°2′E
- Country: Poland
- Voivodeship: Greater Poland
- County: Ostrów
- Gmina: Sieroszewice
- Population: 865

Psary [ˈpsarɨ] is a village in the administrative district of Gmina Sieroszewice, within Ostrów County, Greater Poland Voivodeship, in west-central Poland.
