= Zamość, Gmina Sieroszewice =

Zamość
- Village
- Location within Poland
- Coordinates: 51°33′N 18°9′E
- Country: Poland
- Voivodeship: Greater Poland
- County: Ostrów
- Gmina: Sieroszewice

Zamość (Polish pronunciation: [ˈzamɔɕt͡ɕ]) is a village in the administrative district of Gmina Sieroszewice, within Ostrów County, Greater Poland Voivodeship, in west-central Poland.
