= Gorzyce Małe =

- Village
- Location within Poland
- Coordinates: 51°36′27″N 17°42′28″E
- Country: Poland
- Voivodeship: Greater Poland
- County: Ostrów
- Gmina: Odolanów
- Population: 400

Gorzyce Małe [ɡɔˈʐɨt͡sɛ ˈmawɛ] is a village in the administrative district of Gmina Odolanów, within Ostrów County, Greater Poland Voivodeship, in west-central Poland.
