= Grochowiska =

Grochowiska may refer any of the following villages in Poland:

- Grochowiska, Lower Silesian Voivodeship (south-west Poland)
- Grochowiska, Kuyavian-Pomeranian Voivodeship (north-central Poland)
- Grochowiska, Świętokrzyskie Voivodeship (south-central Poland), site of the Battle of Grochowiska in 1863
- Grochowiska, Greater Poland Voivodeship (west-central Poland)
- Grochowiska, West Pomeranian Voivodeship (north-west Poland)
