= Langenheim =

Langenheim is a surname. Notable people with the surname include:

- Jean Langenheim, botanist
- Ruby Rose Langenheim, actress

Langenheim was also the German name of the Polish village Sieroszewice from 1943-1945.

== See also ==
- Langelsheim
