= Gorzyce Wielkie =

- Village
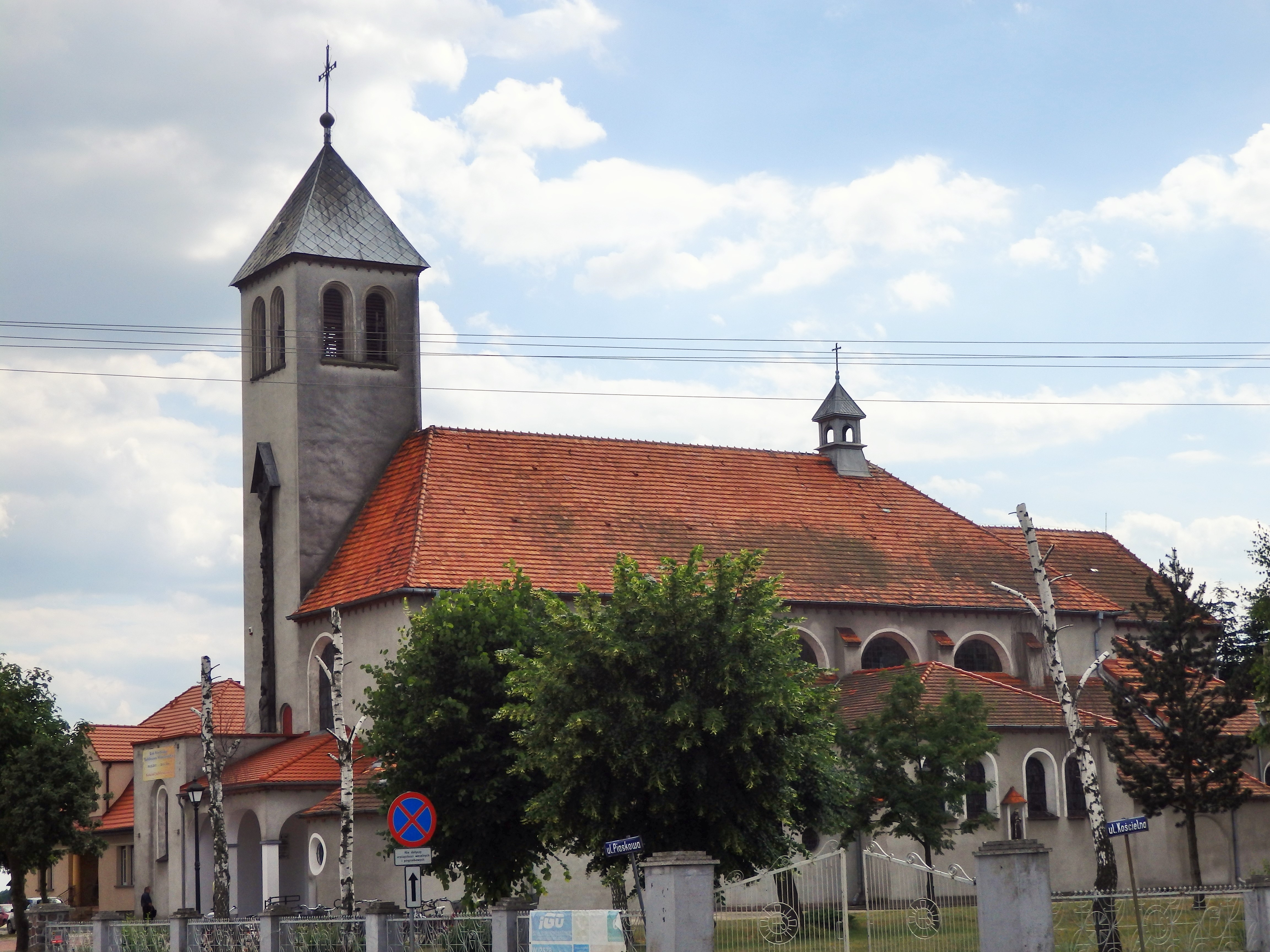
- Church of the Sacred Heart

- Location within Poland
- Coordinates: 51°38′15″N 17°43′41″E
- Country: Poland
- Voivodeship: Greater Poland
- County: Ostrów
- Gmina: Ostrów Wielkopolski

Population
  - Total: 2,076

Gorzyce Wielkie [ɡɔˈʐɨt͡sɛ ˈvjɛlkʲɛ] is a village in the administrative district of Gmina Ostrów Wielkopolski, within Ostrów County, Greater Poland Voivodeship, in west-central Poland.
