= Topola Wielka =

- Village
- Location within Poland
- Coordinates: 51°36′N 17°46′E
- Country: Poland
- Voivodeship: Greater Poland
- County: Ostrów
- Gmina: Przygodzice
- Population: 470

Topola Wielka [tɔˈpɔla ˈvjɛlka] is a village in the administrative district of Gmina Przygodzice, within Ostrów County, Greater Poland Voivodeship, in west-central Poland.

== Notable people ==
Flag rank Naval officer Józef Bartosik was born in Topola Wielka, in 1917.
