= Antonin-Strugi =

- Settlement
- Location within Poland
- Coordinates: 51°33′18″N 17°50′42″E
- Country: Poland
- Voivodeship: Greater Poland
- County: Ostrów
- Gmina: Przygodzice

Antonin-Strugi (Polish pronunciation: [anˈtɔɲin ˈstruɡʲi]) is a settlement in the administrative district of Gmina Przygodzice, within Ostrów County, Greater Poland Voivodeship, in west-central Poland.
