= Przygodzki =

Przygodzki may refer to:

== People with the surname ==
- Ryszard Przygodzki (born 1957), Polish footballer
- Paweł Przygodzki, Secretary general of the Order of Saint Paul the First Hermit

== See also ==
- Janków Przygodzki, village in Poland
