= Kaczory =

Kaczory may refer to the following places in Poland:

- Kaczory, Gmina Wiśniew in Masovian Voivodeship (east-central Poland)
- Kaczory, Gmina Wodynie in Masovian Voivodeship (east-central Poland)
- Kaczory, Gmina Odolanów, Ostrów County in Greater Poland Voivodeship (west-central Poland)
- Kaczory, Piła County in Greater Poland Voivodeship (west-central Poland)
- Kaczory, Warmian-Masurian Voivodeship (north Poland)
