= Sobczyn =

- Settlement
- Location within Poland
- Coordinates: 51°39′37″N 17°42′25″E
- Country: Poland
- Voivodeship: Greater Poland
- County: Ostrów
- Gmina: Ostrów Wielkopolski
- Population: 6

Sobczyn [ˈsɔpt͡ʂɨn] is a settlement in the administrative district of Gmina Ostrów Wielkopolski, within Ostrów County, Greater Poland Voivodeship, in west-central Poland.
