= Lipiny, Gmina Odolanów =

Lipiny
- Settlement
- Location within Poland
- Coordinates: 51°32′N 17°38′E
- Country: Poland
- Voivodeship: Greater Poland
- County: Ostrów
- Gmina: Odolanów

Lipiny [liˈpinɨ] is a settlement in the administrative district of Gmina Odolanów, within Ostrów County, Greater Poland Voivodeship, in west-central Poland.
