= Bilczew =

Bilczew refers to the following places in Greater Poland Voivodeship, Poland:

- Bilczew, Konin County
- Bilczew, Gmina Sieroszewice, Ostrów County
