= Świeca, Greater Poland Voivodeship =

Świeca
- Village
- Location within Poland
- Coordinates: 51°32′14″N 17°41′59″E
- Country: Poland
- Voivodeship: Greater Poland
- County: Ostrów
- Gmina: Odolanów
- Elevation: 121 m (397 ft)

Świeca (Polish: [ˈɕfjɛt͡sa]) is a village in the administrative district of Gmina Odolanów, within Ostrów County, Greater Poland Voivodeship, in west-central Poland.
