= Raduchów =

Village in Poland

- Village
- Location within Poland
- Coordinates: 51°35′N 18°11′E
- Country: Poland
- Voivodeship: Greater Poland
- County: Ostrów
- Gmina: Sieroszewice

Raduchów [raˈduxuf] is a village in the administrative district of Gmina Sieroszewice, within Ostrów County, Greater Poland Voivodeship, in west-central Poland.
