= Raczyce, Greater Poland Voivodeship =

Raczyce
- Village
- Location within Poland
- Coordinates: 51°35′N 17°38′E
- Country: Poland
- Voivodeship: Greater Poland
- County: Ostrów
- Gmina: Odolanów
- Population: 1,200

Raczyce [raˈt͡ʂɨt͡sɛ] is a village in the administrative district of Gmina Odolanów, within Ostrów County, Greater Poland Voivodeship, in west-central Poland.
