= Dębnica =

Dębnica may refer to the following places in Poland:

- Dębnica, Lower Silesian Voivodeship (south-west Poland)
- Dębnica, Masovian Voivodeship (east-central Poland)
- Dębnica, Gniezno County in Greater Poland Voivodeship (west-central Poland)
- Dębnica, Gmina Przygodzice, Ostrów County in Greater Poland Voivodeship (west-central Poland)
- Dębnica, Pomeranian Voivodeship (north Poland)
