= Kuroch =

Kuroch may refer to:

- Kuroch, Iran
- Kuroch, Greater Poland Voivodeship
