= Uciechów =

Uciechów may refer to the following places in Poland:

- Uciechów, Lower Silesian Voivodeship (south-west Poland)
- Uciechów, Greater Poland Voivodeship (west-central Poland)
