= Radziwiłłów =

Radziwiłłów is a Polish toponym referring to the Radziwiłł noble family. It may refer to:

- Radziwiłłów, Greater Poland Voivodeship, village in Greater Poland Voivodeship
- Radziwiłłów, Masovian Voivodeship, village in Masovian Voivodeship
- Radyvyliv, town in Ukraine (formerly in Poland)
