= Westrza =

- Village
- Location within Poland
- Coordinates: 51°37′N 17°58′E
- Country: Poland
- Voivodeship: Greater Poland
- County: Ostrów
- Gmina: Sieroszewice

Westrza [ˈvɛstʂa] is a village in the administrative district of Gmina Sieroszewice, within Ostrów County, Greater Poland Voivodeship, in west-central Poland.
