= Mazury, Greater Poland Voivodeship =

Mazury
- Village
- Location within Poland
- Coordinates: 51°39′50″N 17°35′51″E
- Country: Poland
- Voivodeship: Greater Poland
- County: Ostrów
- Gmina: Ostrów Wielkopolski

Mazury [maˈzurɨ] is a village in the administrative district of Gmina Ostrów Wielkopolski, within Ostrów County, Greater Poland Voivodeship, in west-central Poland.
