= Borowiec, Greater Poland Voivodeship =

Borowiec
- Village
- Location within Poland
- Coordinates: 51°46′36″N 17°49′7″E
- Country: Poland
- Voivodeship: Greater Poland
- County: Ostrów
- Gmina: Ostrów Wielkopolski

Borowiec [bɔˈrɔvjɛt͡s] is a village in the administrative district of Gmina Ostrów Wielkopolski, within Ostrów County, Greater Poland Voivodeship, in west-central Poland.
