= Ludwików, Gmina Przygodzice =

Ludwików
- Village
- Location within Poland
- Coordinates: 51°31′N 17°49′E
- Country: Poland
- Voivodeship: Greater Poland
- County: Ostrów
- Gmina: Przygodzice

Ludwików [ludˈvikuf] is a village in the administrative district of Gmina Przygodzice, within Ostrów County, Greater Poland Voivodeship, in west-central Poland.
