= Chruszczyny =

- Village
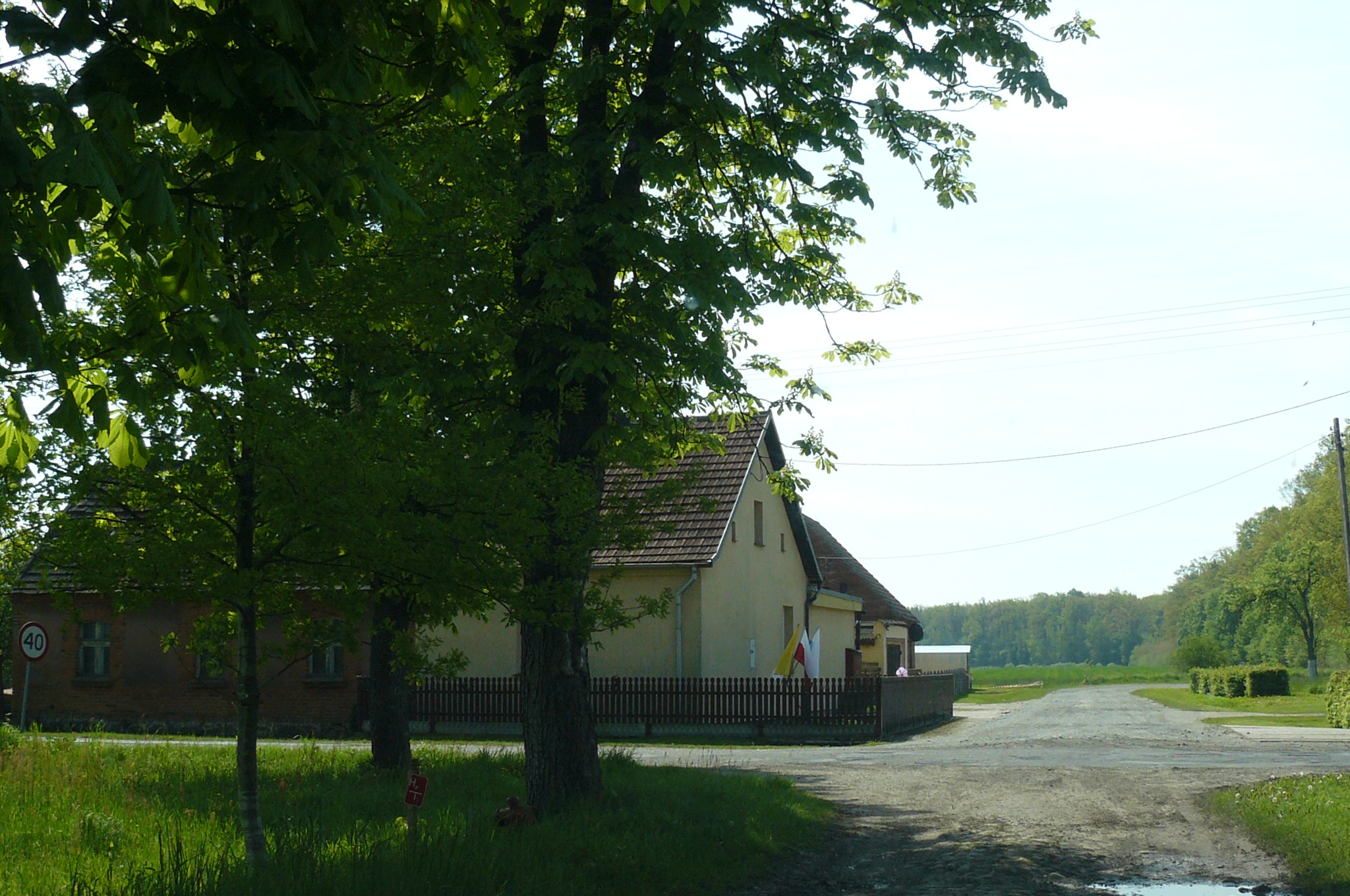
- A house in Chruszczyny, the hamlet of Palczew.

- Location within Poland
- Coordinates: 51°38′42″N 17°35′35″E
- Country: Poland
- Voivodeship: Greater Poland
- County: Ostrów
- Gmina: Ostrów Wielkopolski

Chruszczyny [xruʂˈt͡ʂɨnɨ] is a village in the administrative district of Gmina Ostrów Wielkopolski, within Ostrów County, Greater Poland Voivodeship, in west-central Poland.
