= Wtorek =

Wtorek may refer to:

- wtorek, Tuesday in Polish
- Wtorek (film), a Polish movie from 2001

== See also ==
- Wtórek, Gmina Ostrów Wielkopolski, Ostrów County, Greater Poland Voivodeship, Poland
