= Górzno (disambiguation) =

Górzno is a town in Kuyavian-Pomeranian Voivodeship, north-central Poland.

Górzno may also refer to the following places:

- Górzno, Leszno County in Greater Poland Voivodeship (west-central Poland)
- Górzno, Masovian Voivodeship (east-central Poland)
- Górzno, Gmina Ostrów Wielkopolski in Greater Poland Voivodeship (west-central Poland)
- Górzno, West Pomeranian Voivodeship (north-west Poland)
- Górzno, Polish name for Göhren, Rügen (north-east Germany)
