= Czarnylas, Greater Poland Voivodeship =

Czarnylas
- Village
- Location within Poland
- Coordinates: 51°30′N 17°46′E
- Country: Poland
- Voivodeship: Greater Poland
- County: Ostrów
- Gmina: Przygodzice
- Elevation: 133 m (436 ft)
- Population: 1,000

Czarnylas [t͡ʂarˈnɨlas] is a village in the administrative district of Gmina Przygodzice, within Ostrów County, Greater Poland Voivodeship, in west-central Poland.
