= Aleksander Skrzyński =

Polish politician (1882–1931)

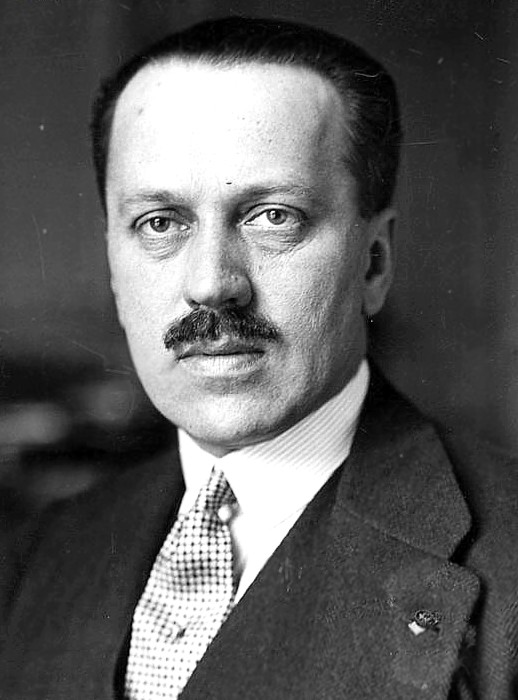

13th Prime Minister of Poland
- In office 20 November 1925 – 5 May 1926
- President: Stanisław Wojciechowski
- Preceded by: Władysław Grabski
- Succeeded by: Wincenty Witos

Minister of Foreign Affairs
- In office 27 July 1924 – 5 May 1926
- Prime Minister: Władysław Grabski; Himself
- Preceded by: Maurycy Zamoyski
- Succeeded by: Kajetan Dzierżykraj-Morawski
- In office 16 December 1922 – 26 May 1923
- Prime Minister: Władysław Sikorski
- Preceded by: Gabriel Narutowicz
- Succeeded by: Marian Seyda

Personal details
- Born: Aleksander Józef Skrzyński; 19 March 1882 Zagórzany, Galicia and Lodomeria
- Died: 25 September 1931 (aged 49) Łąkociny, Poland
- Party: Stronnictwo Prawicy Narodowej

Aleksander Józef Skrzyński (Polish pronunciation: [alɛˈksandɛr ˈskʂɨj̃skʲi]; 19 March 1882 – 25 September 1931) was a Polish politician from Zagórzany, Galicia, who served as the 13th Prime Minister of Poland from 1925 to 1926.

He was the first Polish Ambassador to Romania (accredited in 1919), and played a significant part in the negotiations that led to the Polish–Romanian alliance. Later, he served as Minister of Foreign Affairs of the Republic of Poland for two terms, from 1922 to 1923, and from 1924 to 1926.

Shortly after leaving office of prime minister, he engaged in a duel with Stanisław Szeptycki, in which Skrzynski refused to fire. He was killed in a car accident at Łąkociny, Poland.

Political offices
Preceded by Gabriel Narutowicz	Minister of Foreign Affairs of the Republic of Poland; 1922–1923	Succeeded by Marian Seyda
Preceded by Maurycy Zamoyski	Minister of Foreign Affairs of the Republic of Poland; 1924–1926	Succeeded by Kajetan Dzierżykraj-Morawski
Preceded by Władysław Grabski	Prime Minister of Poland; 1925–1926	Succeeded by Wincenty Witos
