= Wysocko Małe =

- Village
- Location within Poland
- Coordinates: 51°36′N 17°50′E
- Country: Poland
- Voivodeship: Greater Poland
- County: Ostrów
- Gmina: Przygodzice
- Population: 1,186

Wysocko Małe [vɨˈsɔt͡skɔ ˈmawɛ] is a village in the administrative district of Gmina Przygodzice, within Ostrów County, Greater Poland Voivodeship, in west-central Poland.
