= Gliśnica, Greater Poland Voivodeship =

Gliśnica
- Village
- Location within Poland
- Coordinates: 51°36′N 17°39′E
- Country: Poland
- Voivodeship: Greater Poland
- County: Ostrów
- Gmina: Odolanów

Gliśnica [ɡliɕˈnit͡sa] is a village in the administrative district of Gmina Odolanów, within Ostrów County, Greater Poland Voivodeship, in west-central Poland.

The first record about Gliśnica dates back to 1652. Since 1819 the village was part of Thurn und Taxis family's possessions. In 1789 the village had 164 inhabitants, in 1822 had 200, and at the end of 19th-century over 400, of which half were Protestants. During the German occupation (1939–1945) it was temporarily called Schönfeld.

On the area of the former manor are located three great pedunculate oaks – their circuits are following: 504, 598 and 658 cm. The 29-meters high trees are natural monuments. Nearby are situated old farm buildings and forest inspectorate from the beginning of the 20th century. On the side of football pitch is situated a Protestant graveyard working through the 19th century until 1940s.
