= Baby, Gmina Ostrów Wielkopolski =

Village in Poland

Baby
- Village
- Location within Poland
- Coordinates: 51°41′7″N 17°52′51″E
- Country: Poland
- Voivodeship: Greater Poland
- County: Ostrów
- Gmina: Ostrów Wielkopolski
- Population: 41

Baby [ˈbabɨ] is a village in the administrative district of Gmina Ostrów Wielkopolski, within Ostrów County, Greater Poland Voivodeship, in west-central Poland.
