= Namysłaki =

- Village
- Location within Poland
- Coordinates: 51°34′N 18°5′E
- Country: Poland
- Voivodeship: Greater Poland
- County: Ostrów
- Gmina: Sieroszewice

Namysłaki [namɨˈswaki] is a village in the administrative district of Gmina Sieroszewice, within Ostrów County, Greater Poland Voivodeship, in west-central Poland.

The former name in the 18th century was Deutschhof, a part of the German Rich (Deutsches Reich) in the former Provinz Posen in the circle Schildberg. It came to Poland after the First World War.
