= Lazar Raschkow =

German-Jewish physician (1798–1870)

- Born: Eleazar Raschkow; 1798; Raschkow, Kingdom of Prussia
- Died: 2 August 1870 (aged 72); Posen, Prussia, North German Confederation
- Education: University of Budapest
- Writing career
- Language: Hebrew
- Literary movement: Haskalah

Lazar Raschkow (Hebrew: אלעזר ראשקאוו; 1798 – 2 August 1870) was a German Jewish medical doctor, writer, and poet.

Born in Raschkow, he received his early instruction in Hebrew from his father, the local rabbi, and later studied at the yeshiva of Rabbi Tuvia Asche. At an early age he took a position as tutor at Neisse, where he prepared himself for the secunda of the gymnasium of that city. After his graduation he studied medicine at the University of Budapest, and was then appointed surgeon in the Austrian army, but was obliged to resign because of his writings on behalf of the emancipation of the Jews.

Raschkow then began to practise at Mád, but being soon forced to give up this work on account of ill health, he engaged in tutoring and writing. From this period dates his history Ḳerot yeme 'olam, while his dramatic poem Amnon ve-Tamar (Breslau, 1832) was a product of his youth. Shortly before his death he composed his epitaph, in which he related the story of his life.
