= Wysocko Wielkie =

- Village
- Location within Poland
- Coordinates: 51°38′N 17°51′E
- Country: Poland
- Voivodeship: Greater Poland
- County: Ostrów
- Gmina: Ostrów Wielkopolski
- Population: 1,000

Wysocko Wielkie [vɨˈsɔt͡skɔ ˈvjɛlkʲɛ] is a village in the administrative district of Gmina Ostrów Wielkopolski, within Ostrów County, Greater Poland Voivodeship, in west-central Poland.
