= Parczew, Greater Poland Voivodeship =

Parczew
- Village
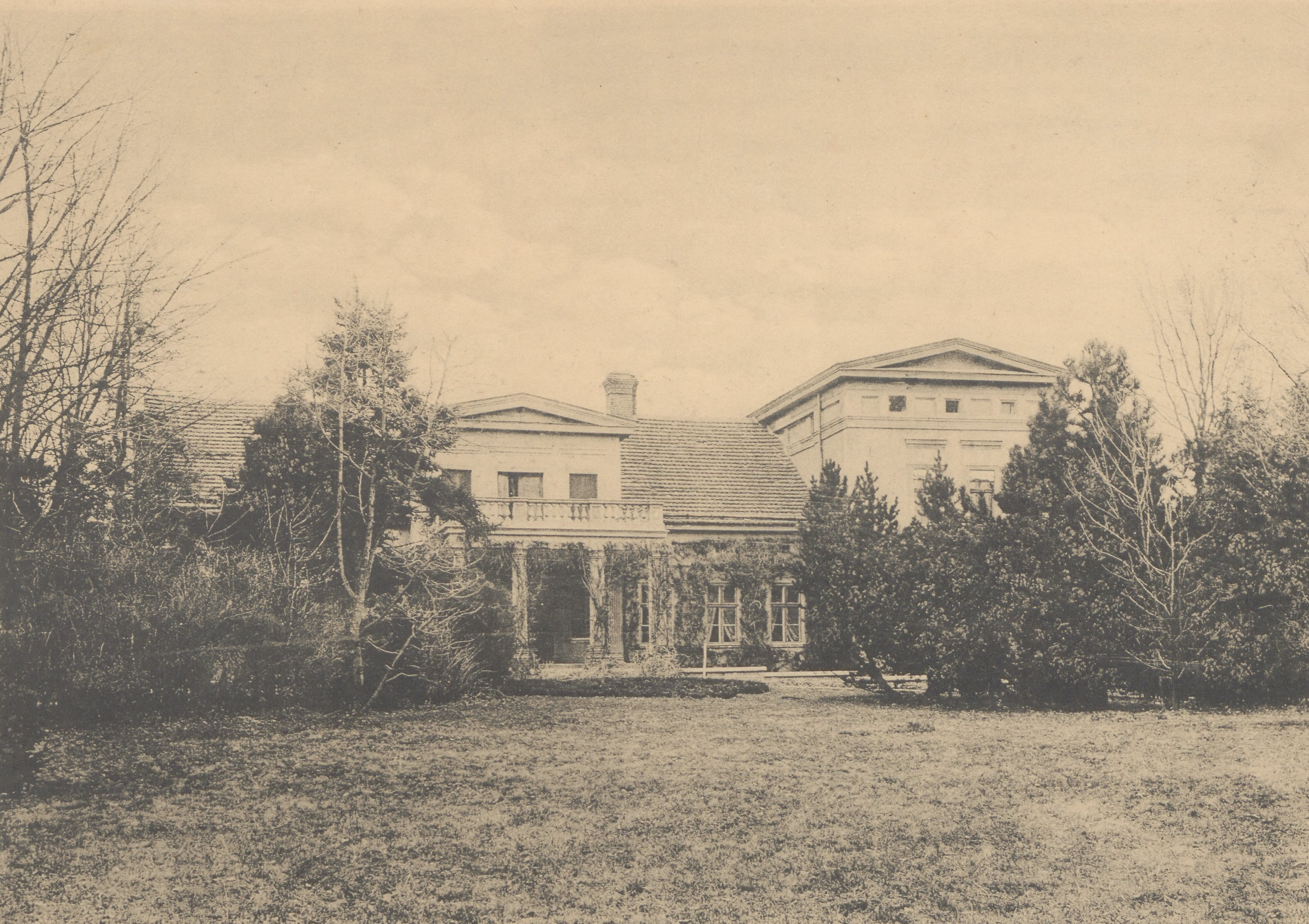
- Manor house in Parczew in the early 20th century

- Location within Poland
- Coordinates: 51°38′17″N 17°55′15″E
- Country: Poland
- Voivodeship: Greater Poland
- County: Ostrów
- Gmina: Sieroszewice

Population
  - Total: 550
- Time zone: UTC+1 (CET)
  - Summer (DST): UTC+2 (CEST)

Parczew [ˈpart͡ʂɛf] is a village in the administrative district of Gmina Sieroszewice, within Ostrów County, Greater Poland Voivodeship, in west-central Poland.
