= Papiernia =

Papiernia may refer to the following places:

- Papiernia, Kielce County in Świętokrzyskie Voivodeship (south-central Poland)
- Papiernia, Końskie County in Świętokrzyskie Voivodeship (south-central Poland)
- Papiernia, Włoszczowa County in Świętokrzyskie Voivodeship (south-central Poland)
- Papiernia, Masovian Voivodeship (east-central Poland)
- Papiernia, Leszno County in Greater Poland Voivodeship (west-central Poland)
- Papiernia, Gmina Odolanów, Ostrów County in Greater Poland Voivodeship (west-central Poland)
- Papiernia, Pomeranian Voivodeship (north Poland)
- Papiernia, Warmian-Masurian Voivodeship (north Poland)
- Papierna, the former Polish name of the village Papirnia, in Ternopil oblast, Ukraine
