= Czekanów, Greater Poland Voivodeship =

Czekanów
- Village
- Location within Poland
- Coordinates: 51°40′40″N 17°51′55″E
- Country: Poland
- Voivodeship: Greater Poland
- County: Ostrów
- Gmina: Ostrów Wielkopolski
- Population: 780

Czekanów [t͡ʂɛˈkanuf] is a village in the administrative district of Gmina Ostrów Wielkopolski, within Ostrów County, Greater Poland Voivodeship, in west-central Poland.
