= Strzyżew, Gmina Sieroszewice =

Strzyżew
- Village
- Location within Poland
- Coordinates: 51°35′N 17°58′E
- Country: Poland
- Voivodeship: Greater Poland
- County: Ostrów
- Gmina: Sieroszewice
- Population (approx.): 1,100

Strzyżew [ˈstʂɨʐɛf] is a village in the administrative district of Gmina Sieroszewice, within Ostrów County, Greater Poland Voivodeship, in west-central Poland.

The village has an approximate population of 1,100.
