= Topola-Osiedle =

- Village
- Location within Poland
- Coordinates: 51°36′45″N 17°45′54″E
- Country: Poland
- Voivodeship: Greater Poland
- County: Ostrów
- Gmina: Przygodzice

Topola-Osiedle [tɔˈpɔla ɔˈɕɛdlɛ] is a village in the administrative district of Gmina Przygodzice, within Ostrów County, Greater Poland Voivodeship, in west-central Poland.
