= Ostrów County =

Ostrów County (powiat ostrowski) may refer to either of two counties (powiats) in Poland:

- Ostrów County, in Masovian Voivodeship (east-central Poland)
- Ostrów County, in Greater Poland Voivodeship (west-central Poland)
