= Wisławka =

- Settlement
- Location within Poland
- Coordinates: 51°36′13″N 17°34′26″E
- Country: Poland
- Voivodeship: Greater Poland
- County: Ostrów
- Gmina: Odolanów

Wisławka [viˈswafka] is a settlement in the administrative district of Gmina Odolanów, within Ostrów County, Greater Poland Voivodeship, in west-central Poland.
