= Masanów =

- Village
- Location within Poland
- Coordinates: 51°36′N 18°4′E
- Country: Poland
- Voivodeship: Greater Poland
- County: Ostrów
- Gmina: Sieroszewice
- Elevation: 130 m (430 ft)

Masanów [maˈsanuf] is a village in the administrative district of Gmina Sieroszewice, within Ostrów County, Greater Poland Voivodeship, in west-central Poland.

With Masanów is related Paweł Bryliński, a folk sculptor.

Before 1887 it was administrated by Odolanów County. Between 1975 and 1998 it was contained in Kalisz Voivodenship and in 1887-1975 and after 1998 in Ostrów County.

There is an elementary school.
