= Smardów =

- village
- Location within Poland
- Coordinates: 51°36′N 17°52′E
- Country: Poland
- Voivodeship: Greater Poland
- County: Ostrów
- Gmina: Przygodzice

Smardów [ˈsmarduf] is a village in the administrative district of Gmina Przygodzice, within Ostrów County, Greater Poland Voivodeship, in west-central Poland.
