= Tarchały Małe =

- Village
- Location within Poland
- Coordinates: 51°37′2″N 17°41′25″E
- Country: Poland
- Voivodeship: Greater Poland
- County: Ostrów
- Gmina: Odolanów
- Population: 180

Tarchały Małe [tarˈxawɨ ˈmawɛ] is a village in the administrative district of Gmina Odolanów, within Ostrów County, Greater Poland Voivodeship, in west-central Poland.
