= Gutów, Greater Poland Voivodeship =

Gutów
- Village
- Location within Poland
- Coordinates: 51°45′N 17°52′E
- Country: Poland
- Voivodeship: Greater Poland
- County: Ostrów
- Gmina: Ostrów Wielkopolski
- Population: 300

Gutów [ˈɡutuf] is a village in the administrative district of Gmina Ostrów Wielkopolski, within Ostrów County, Greater Poland Voivodeship, in west-central Poland.
