= Garki, Poland =

Garki
- Village
- Location within Poland
- Coordinates: 51°32′N 17°38′E
- Country: Poland
- Voivodeship: Greater Poland
- County: Ostrów
- Gmina: Odolanów
- Elevation: 114 m (374 ft)

Garki [ˈɡarki] is a village in the administrative district of Gmina Odolanów, within Ostrów County, Greater Poland Voivodeship, in west-central Poland.
