= Biernacice, Greater Poland Voivodeship =

Biernacice
- Village
- Location within Poland
- Coordinates: 51°32′9″N 18°8′8″E
- Country: Poland
- Voivodeship: Greater Poland
- County: Ostrów
- Gmina: Sieroszewice
- Elevation: 130 m (430 ft)
- Population: 119

Biernacice [bjɛrnaˈt͡ɕit͡sɛ] is a village in the administrative district of Gmina Sieroszewice, within Ostrów County, Greater Poland Voivodeship, in west-central Poland.
