= Karski =

Karski might refer to:

- Karski, alias used by Polish socialist Julian Marchlewski (1866–1925)
- Jan Karski (1914–2000), Polish resistance leader
- Karol Karski (born 1966), Polish politician
- Karski, Poland, a village in Greater Poland Voivodeship

== See also ==
- Karksi, Estonia
