= Onęber =

- Village
- Location within Poland
- Coordinates: 51°40′01″N 17°35′15″E
- Country: Poland
- Voivodeship: Greater Poland
- County: Ostrów
- Gmina: Ostrów Wielkopolski

Onęber [ɔˈnɛmbɛr] is a village in the administrative district of Gmina Ostrów Wielkopolski, within Ostrów County, Greater Poland Voivodeship, in west-central Poland.
