= Kwiatków, Gmina Ostrów Wielkopolski =

Kwiatków
- Village
- Location within Poland
- Coordinates: 51°42′N 17°53′E
- Country: Poland
- Voivodeship: Greater Poland
- County: Ostrów
- Gmina: Ostrów Wielkopolski
- Population (approx.): 500

Kwiatków [ˈkfjatkuf] is a village in the administrative district of Gmina Ostrów Wielkopolski, within Ostrów County, Greater Poland Voivodeship, in west-central Poland.

The village has an approximate population of 500.
