= Młynów, Greater Poland Voivodeship =

Młynów
- Village
- Location within Poland
- Coordinates: 51°43′22″N 17°52′52″E
- Country: Poland
- Voivodeship: Greater Poland
- County: Ostrów
- Gmina: Ostrów Wielkopolski
- Population: 100

Młynów [ˈmwɨnuf] is a village in the administrative district of Gmina Ostrów Wielkopolski, within Ostrów County, Greater Poland Voivodeship, in west-central Poland.
