= Baby, Gmina Odolanów =

Settlement in Poland

Baby
- Hamlet
- Location within Poland
- Coordinates: 51°36′8″N 17°40′19″E
- Country: Poland
- Voivodeship: Greater Poland
- County: Ostrów
- Gmina: Odolanów
- Population: 333

Baby [ˈbabɨ] is a hamlet in the administrative district of Gmina Odolanów, within Ostrów County, Greater Poland Voivodeship, in west-central Poland.
