= Wierzbno, Gmina Odolanów =

Wierzbno
- Village
- Location within Poland
- Coordinates: 51°38′14″N 17°38′39″E
- Country: Poland
- Voivodeship: Greater Poland
- County: Ostrów
- Gmina: Odolanów

Wierzbno [ˈvjɛʐbnɔ] is a village in the administrative district of Gmina Odolanów, within Ostrów County, Greater Poland Voivodeship, in west-central Poland.
