= Uciechów, Greater Poland Voivodeship =

Uciechów
- Village
- Location within Poland
- Coordinates: 51°34′N 17°35′E
- Country: Poland
- Voivodeship: Greater Poland
- County: Ostrów
- Gmina: Odolanów
- Population (approx.): 1,025
- Website: http://latomi.republika.pl/

Uciechów [uˈt͡ɕɛxuf] is a village in the administrative district of Gmina Odolanów, within Ostrów County, Greater Poland Voivodeship, in west-central Poland.

The village has an approximate population of 1,025.
