= Kuroch, Greater Poland Voivodeship =

Kuroch
- Settlement
- Location within Poland
- Coordinates: 51°37′54″N 17°37′29″E
- Country: Poland
- Voivodeship: Greater Poland
- County: Ostrów
- Gmina: Odolanów

Kuroch [ˈkurɔx] is a settlement in the administrative district of Gmina Odolanów, within Ostrów County, Greater Poland Voivodeship, in west-central Poland.
