= Grochowiska, Greater Poland Voivodeship =

Grochowiska
- Village
- Location within Poland
- Coordinates: 51°34′N 17°44′E
- Country: Poland
- Voivodeship: Greater Poland
- County: Ostrów
- Gmina: Odolanów

Grochowiska [ɡrɔxɔˈviska] is a village in the administrative district of Gmina Odolanów, within Ostrów County, Greater Poland Voivodeship, in west-central Poland.
