= Kajetan Dzierżykraj-Morawski =

Polish politician and diplomat

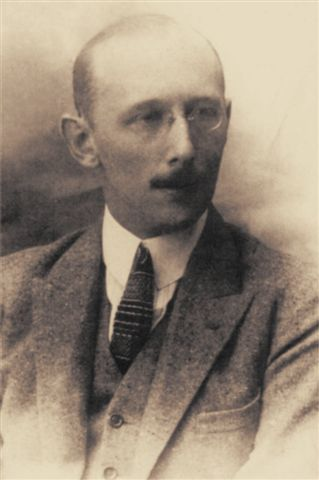
- Kajetan Dzierżykraj-Morawski, before 1939

Minister of Foreign Affairs
- In office 10 May 1926 – 15 May 1926
- Prime Minister: Wincenty Witos; Kazimierz Bartel
- Preceded by: Aleksander Skrzyński
- Succeeded by: August Zaleski

Polish High Commissioner of Danzig
- In office 1 October 1923 – 28 February 1924
- Preceded by: Leon Pluciński
- Succeeded by: Henryk Strasburger

Personal details
- Born: 19 April 1892 Jurkowo, German Empire (now Poland)
- Died: 2 November 1973 (aged 81) Lailly-en-Val, France
- Party: Independent

Kajetan Dzierżykraj-Morawski (also known as Jan Chomęcki; 19 April 1892 – 2 November 1973) was a Polish politician, diplomat, and journalist. He served as the Minister of Foreign Affairs of the Republic of Poland and the "Polish High Commissioner of Danzig".

== Life and career ==
After Poland regained independence in 1918, Kajetan became the Minister of Foreign Affairs, the Polish resident minister for the League of Nations, and became involved in various other governmental roles. After the May Coup in 1926 he was forced to withdraw from politics until he was offered by Eugeniusz Kwiatkowski a position in the Ministry of Foreign Affairs during World War II. The war caused his evacuation first to Romania, then to Paris, and after the German occupation of Paris he evacuated to London. His ambadassor and diplomatic work for France earned the respect of Charles de Gaulle. Despite his withdrawal from diplomacy in Poland, he remained an active ambassador and helped Polish refugees (particularly in France).

Kajetan is the great-grandson of Franciszek Morawski, as well as the cousin of politician Edward Dzierżykraj-Morawski and military commander Witold Dzierżykraj-Morawski.

== Death ==
Kajetan lived out his life in the Polish veterans' care home in Lailly-en-Val near Beaugency and died on 2 November 1973 at the age of 81. He was buried in a cemetery in Lailly-en-Val along with other Polish veterans. Kajetan posthumously received the Order of the White Eagle (Poland) on 11 November 1996 for his duties in World War II.

== Awards and honours ==
=== Polish honours ===
- Order of the White Eagle (Poland) (11 November 1996, posthumously)
- Order of Polonia Restituta
  - Officer's Cross (2 May 1923)
  - Commander's Cross with Star (11 November 1937)
- Medal of the Decade of Independence Regained

=== Foreign honours ===
- Kingdom of Romania
  - Grand Officer of the Order of the Crown (Romania)
- Yugoslavia:
  - Grand Officer of the Order of St. Sava
- Holy See:
  - Knight Grand Cross of the Order of St. Sylvester
- France:
  - Commander of the Legion of Honour
- Belgium:
  - Commander of the Order of the Crown (Belgium)
- Kingdom of Italy:
  - Commander of the Order of the Crown of Italy
