= Zagórzany, Gorlice County =

Zagórzany
- Village
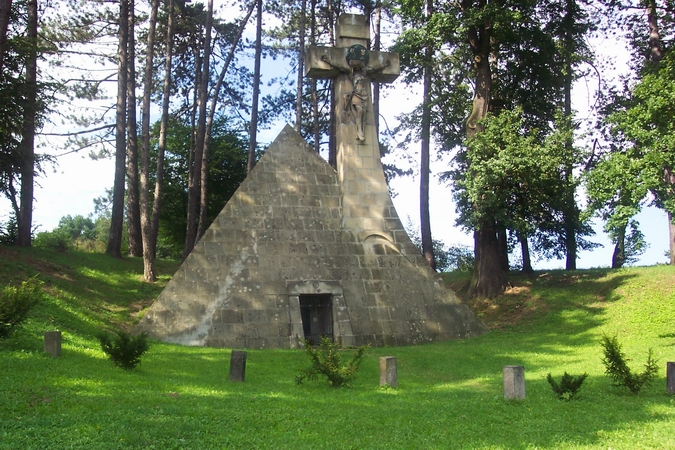
- Skrzyński family tomb

- Location within Poland
- Coordinates: 49°41′57″N 21°9′26″E
- Country: Poland
- Voivodeship: Lesser Poland
- County: Gorlice
- Gmina: Gorlice
- Population: 2,300

Zagórzany [zaɡuˈʐanɨ] is a village in the administrative district of Gmina Gorlice, within Gorlice County, Lesser Poland Voivodeship, in southern Poland.

Polish interwar politician Aleksander Skrzyński was born in the village.
