= Ołobok, Greater Poland Voivodeship =

Ołobok
- Village
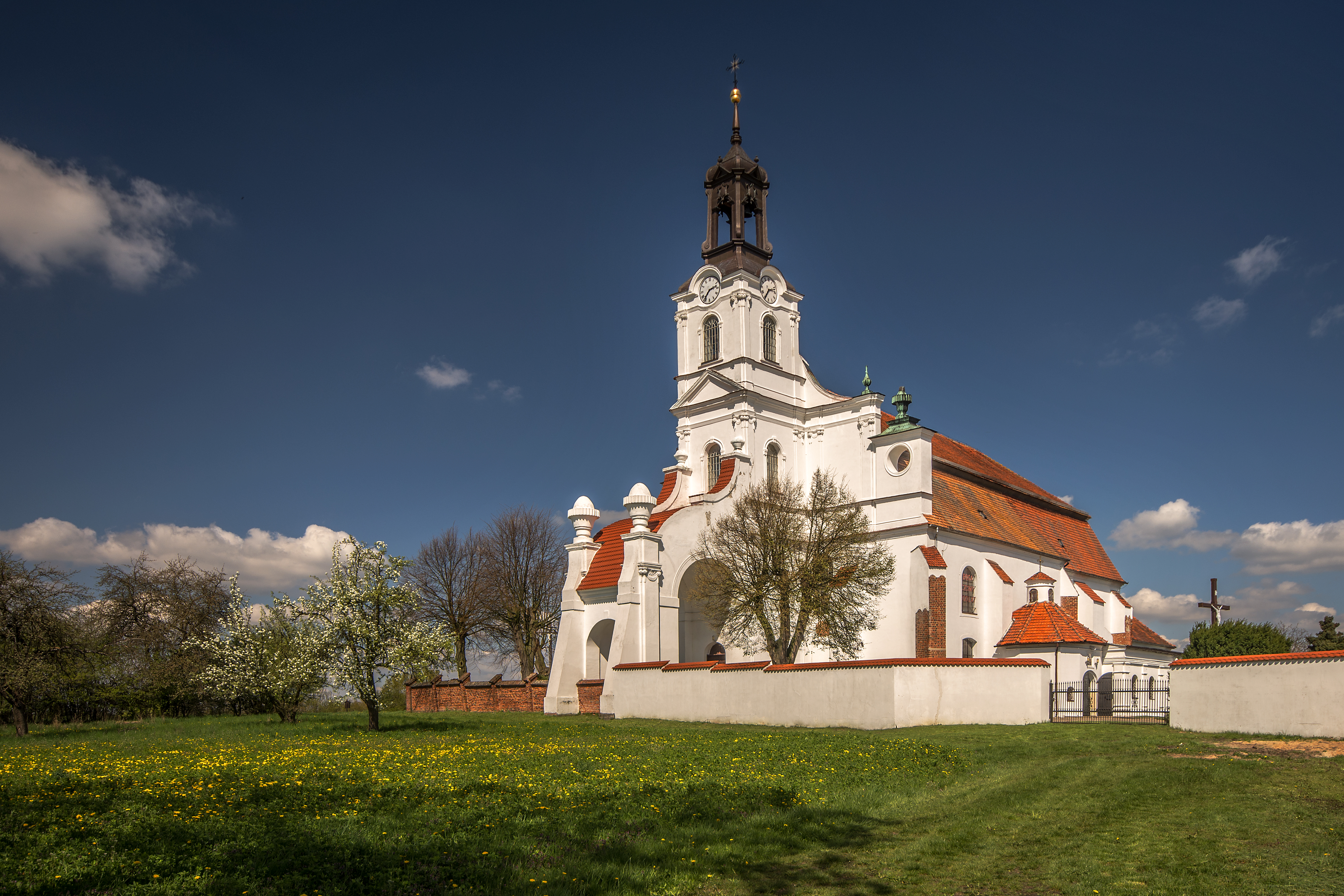
- Church of Saint John the Evangelist

- Location within Poland
- Coordinates: 51°38′3″N 18°4′2″E
- Country: Poland
- Voivodeship: Greater Poland
- County: Ostrów
- Gmina: Sieroszewice

Population
  - Total: 750

Ołobok [ɔˈwɔbɔk] is a village in the administrative district of Gmina Sieroszewice, within Ostrów County, Greater Poland Voivodeship, in west-central Poland.
