= Gmina Odolanów =

Gmina Odolanów Odolanów Commune
- Gmina
- Coat of arms
- Interactive map of Gmina Odolanów
- Coordinates (Odolanów): 51°34′N 17°40′E
- Country: Poland
- Voivodeship: Greater Poland
- County: Ostrów
- Seat: Odolanów

Area
  - Total: 136.03 km^{2} (52.52 sq mi)

Population (2006)
  - Total: 13,867
  - Density: 101.94/km^{2} (264.03/sq mi)
  - Urban: 4,960
  - Rural: 8,907
- Website: http://www.odolanow.pl/

Gmina Odolanów is an urban-rural gmina (administrative district) in Ostrów County, Greater Poland Voivodeship, in west-central Poland. Its seat is the town of Odolanów, which lies approximately 10 kilometres (6 mi) south of Ostrów Wielkopolski and 106 km (66 mi) south-east of the regional capital Poznań.

The gmina covers an area of 136.03 square kilometres (52.5 sq mi), and as of 2006 its total population is 13,867 (out of which the population of Odolanów amounts to 4,960, and the population of the rural part of the gmina is 8,907).

The gmina contains part of the protected area called Barycz Valley Landscape Park.

== Villages ==
Apart from the town of Odolanów, Gmina Odolanów contains the villages and settlements of Baby, Biadaszki, Boników, Garki, Gliśnica, Gorzyce Małe, Grochowiska, Huta, Kaczory, Kuroch, Lipiny, Nabyszyce, Nadstawki, Papiernia, Raczyce, Świeca, Tarchały Małe, Tarchały Wielkie, Trzcieliny, Uciechów, Wierzbno and Wisławka.

== Neighbouring gminas ==
Gmina Odolanów is bordered by the town of Sulmierzyce and by the gminas of Milicz, Ostrów Wielkopolski, Przygodzice and Sośnie.
