= Janków Przygodzki =

- Village
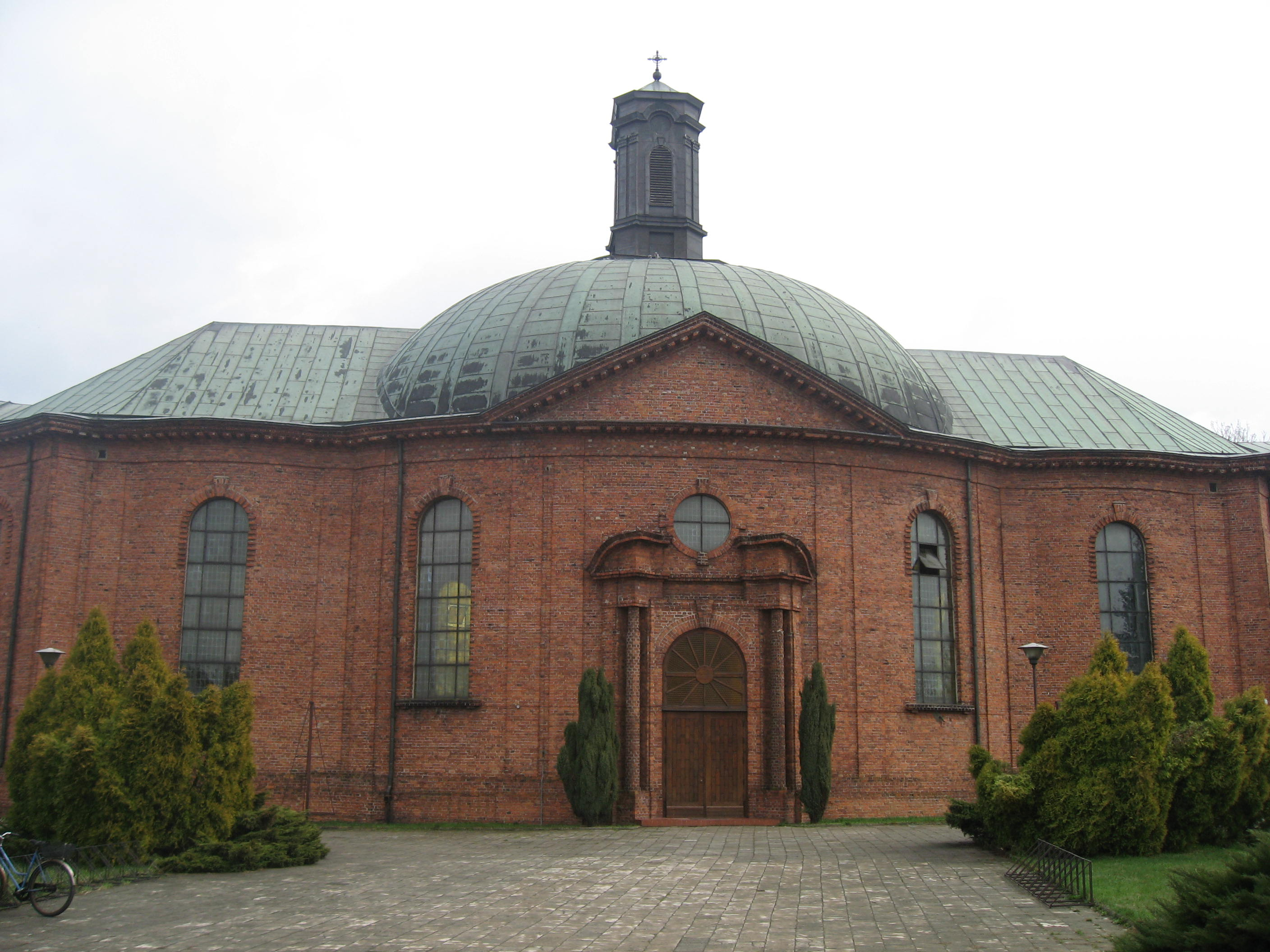

- Location within Poland
- Coordinates: 51°39′49″N 17°47′17″E
- Country: Poland
- Voivodeship: Greater Poland
- County: Ostrów
- Gmina: Przygodzice

Population
  - Total: 1,707

Janków Przygodzki [ˈjankuf pʂɨˈɡɔt͡ski] is a village in the administrative district of Gmina Przygodzice, within Ostrów County, Greater Poland Voivodeship, in west-central Poland.

On 14 November 2013, a gas pipeline explosion damaged several houses in the village. The blast killed two people and injured thirteen.
