= Dębnica, Gmina Przygodzice =

Dębnica
- Village
- Location within Poland
- Coordinates: 51°33′N 17°47′E
- Country: Poland
- Voivodeship: Greater Poland
- County: Ostrów
- Gmina: Przygodzice
- Population: 1,000

Dębnica [dɛmbˈnit͡sa] is a village in the administrative district of Gmina Przygodzice, within Ostrów County, Greater Poland Voivodeship, in west-central Poland.
