= Kaczory, Gmina Odolanów =

Kaczory
- Village
- Location within Poland
- Coordinates: 51°35′29″N 17°39′46″E
- Country: Poland
- Voivodeship: Greater Poland
- County: Ostrów
- Gmina: Odolanów

Kaczory [kaˈt͡ʂɔrɨ] is a village in the administrative district of Gmina Odolanów, within Ostrów County, Greater Poland Voivodeship, in west-central Poland.
