= Gmina Ostrów Wielkopolski =

Gmina Ostrów Wielkopolski Ostrów Wielkopolski Commune
- Gmina
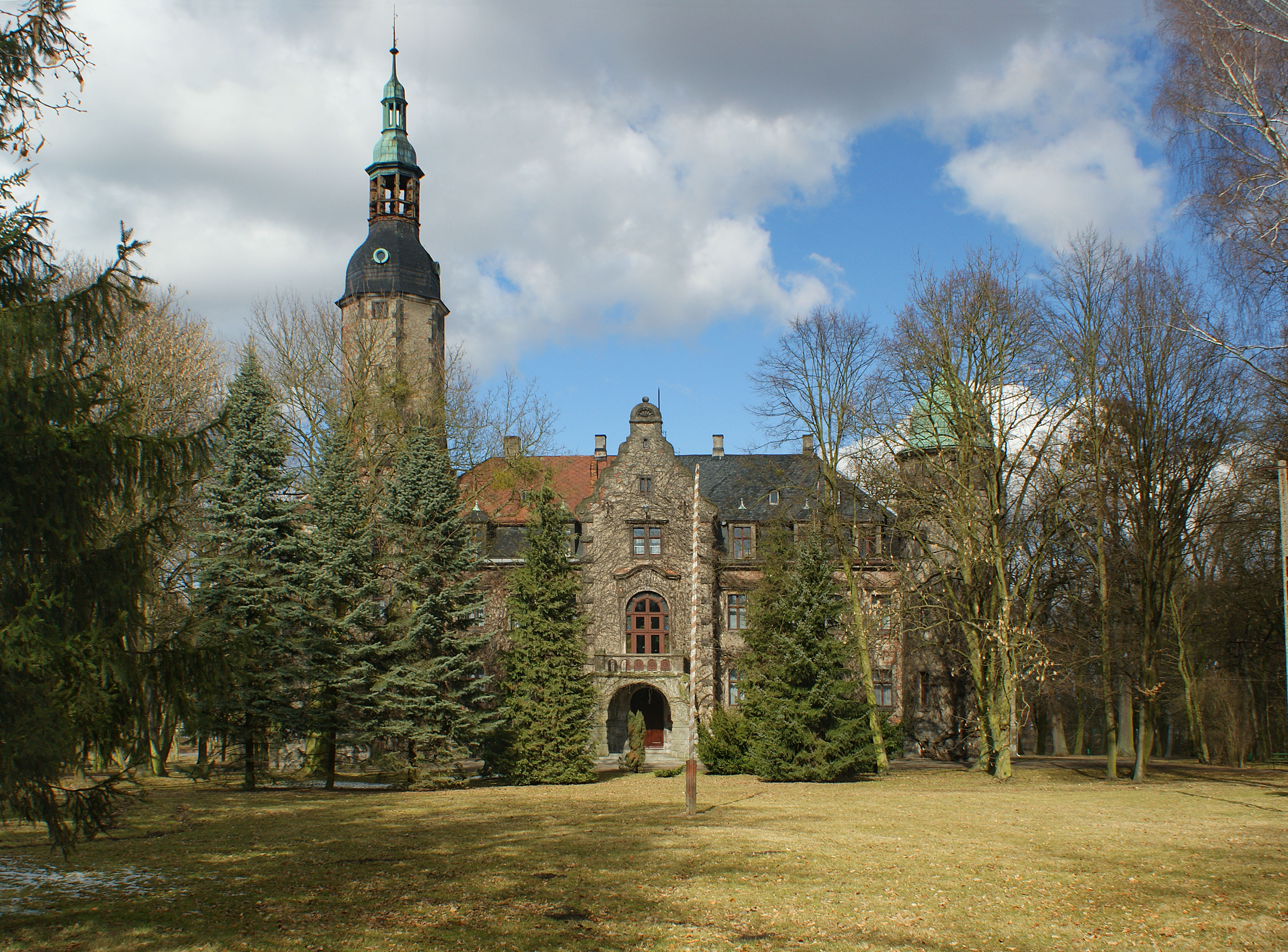

- Flag Coat of arms
- Interactive map of Gmina Ostrów Wielkopolski
- Coordinates (Ostrów Wielkopolski): 51°39′N 17°42′E
- Country: Poland
- Voivodeship: Greater Poland
- County: Ostrów
- Seat: Ostrów Wielkopolski

Area
  - Total: 207 km^{2} (80 sq mi)

Population (2006)
  - Total: 17,969
  - Density: 86.8/km^{2} (225/sq mi)
- Website: http://www.ostrowwielkopolski.pl/index.php

Gmina Ostrów Wielkopolski is a rural gmina (administrative district) in Ostrów County, Greater Poland Voivodeship, in west-central Poland. Its seat is the town of Ostrów Wielkopolski, although the town is not part of the territory of the gmina.

The gmina covers an area of 207 square kilometres (79.9 sq mi), and as of 2006 its total population is 17,969.

== Villages ==
Gmina Ostrów Wielkopolski contains the villages and settlements of Baby, Będzieszyn, Biłgoraje, Biniew, Borowiec, Cegły, Chruszczyny, Czekanów, Daniszyn, Fabryka, Franklinów, Górzenko, Górzno, Gorzyce Wielkie, Gutów, Kąkolewo, Karski, Kołątajew, Kwiatków, Łąkociny, Lamki, Lewków, Lewkowiec, Mazury, Młynów, Nowe Kamienice, Onęber, Radziwiłłów, Sadowie, Słaborowice, Smardowskie Olendry, Sobczyn, Sobótka, Stary Staw, Świeligów, Szczury, Topola Mała, Trąba, Warszty, Wtórek, Wysocko Wielkie, Zacharzew and Zalesie.

== Neighbouring gminas ==
Gmina Ostrów Wielkopolski is bordered by the gminas of Gołuchów, Krotoszyn, Nowe Skalmierzyce, Odolanów, Pleszew, Przygodzice, Raszków and Sieroszewice.
