= Górzno, Gmina Ostrów Wielkopolski =

Górzno
- Village
- Location within Poland
- Coordinates: 51°44′N 17°49′E
- Country: Poland
- Voivodeship: Greater Poland
- County: Ostrów
- Gmina: Ostrów Wielkopolski

Górzno [ˈɡuʐnɔ] is a village in the administrative district of Gmina Ostrów Wielkopolski, within Ostrów County, Greater Poland Voivodeship, in west-central Poland.
