= Gmina Sieroszewice =

Gmina Sieroszewice Sieroszewice Commune
- Gmina
- Coat of arms
- Interactive map of Gmina Sieroszewice
- Coordinates (Sieroszewice): 51°37′59″N 17°58′17″E
- Country: Poland
- Voivodeship: Greater Poland
- County: Ostrów
- Seat: Sieroszewice

Area
  - Total: 163.54 km^{2} (63.14 sq mi)

Population (2006)
  - Total: 9,605
  - Density: 58.73/km^{2} (152.1/sq mi)
- Website: http://www.sieroszewice.pl/

Gmina Sieroszewice is a rural gmina (administrative district) in Ostrów County, Greater Poland Voivodeship, in west-central Poland. Its seat is the village of Sieroszewice, which lies approximately 19 kilometres (12 mi) east of Ostrów Wielkopolski and 112 km (70 mi) south-east of the regional capital Poznań.

The gmina covers an area of 163.54 square kilometres (63.1 sq mi), and as of 2006 its total population is 9,605.

== Villages ==
Gmina Sieroszewice contains the villages and settlements of Bibianki, Biernacice, Bilczew, Kania, Latowice, Masanów, Namysłaki, Ołobok, Parczew, Psary, Raduchów, Rososzyca, Sieroszewice, Sławin, Strzyżew, Westrza, Wielowieś and Zamość.

== Neighbouring gminas ==
Gmina Sieroszewice is bordered by the gminas of Brzeziny, Godziesze Wielkie, Grabów nad Prosną, Kraszewice, Mikstat, Nowe Skalmierzyce, Ostrów Wielkopolski and Przygodzice.
