= Radziwiłłów, Greater Poland Voivodeship =

Radziwiłłów
- Village
- Location within Poland
- Coordinates: 51°37′N 17°42′E
- Country: Poland
- Voivodeship: Greater Poland
- County: Ostrów
- Gmina: Ostrów Wielkopolski
- Population (approx.): 150

Radziwiłłów [rad͡ʑiˈviu̯wuf] is a village in the administrative district of Gmina Ostrów Wielkopolski, within Ostrów County, Greater Poland Voivodeship, in west-central Poland.

The village has an approximate population of 150.
