= Gmina Przygodzice =

Gmina Przygodzice Przygodzice Commune
- Gmina
- Flag Coat of arms
- Interactive map of Gmina Przygodzice
- Coordinates (Przygodzice): 51°35′N 17°50′E
- Country: Poland
- Voivodeship: Greater Poland
- County: Ostrów
- Seat: Przygodzice

Area
  - Total: 163.48 km^{2} (63.12 sq mi)

Population (2006)
  - Total: 11,320
  - Density: 69.24/km^{2} (179.3/sq mi)
- Website: http://www.przygodzice.pl/

Gmina Przygodzice is a rural gmina (administrative district) in Ostrów County, Greater Poland Voivodeship, in west-central Poland. Its seat is the village of Przygodzice, which lies approximately 5 kilometres (3 mi) south of the town of Ostrów Wielkopolski.

The gmina covers an area of 163.48 square kilometres (63.1 sq mi), and as of 2006 its total population is 11,320.

The gmina contains part of the protected area called Barycz Valley Landscape Park.

== Villages ==
Gmina Przygodzice contains the villages and settlements of Antonin, Antonin-Strugi, Bogufałów, Chynowa, Czarnylas, Dębnica, Hetmanów, Janków Przygodzki, Ludwików, Przygodzice, Przygodziczki, Smardów, Topola Wielka, Topola-Osiedle, Trzcieliny and Wysocko Małe.

== Neighbouring gminas ==
Gmina Przygodzice is bordered by the town of Ostrów Wielkopolski and by the gminas of Mikstat, Odolanów, Ostrów Wielkopolski, Ostrzeszów, Sieroszewice and Sośnie.
