= Lewków =

- Village
- Location within Poland
- Coordinates: 51°42′N 17°52′E
- Country: Poland
- Voivodeship: Greater Poland
- County: Ostrów
- Gmina: Ostrów Wielkopolski
- Population: 1,400

Lewków [ˈlɛfkuf] is a village in Poland, located in Gmina Ostrów Wielkopolski, Ostrów County, Greater Poland Voivodeship.

Lewków is located about 6 km northeast of Ostrów Wielkopolski, on the Niedźwiada River. About 1 km west of Lewków, in Michałków, there is the airport of the Ostrowski Aero Club.

== History ==
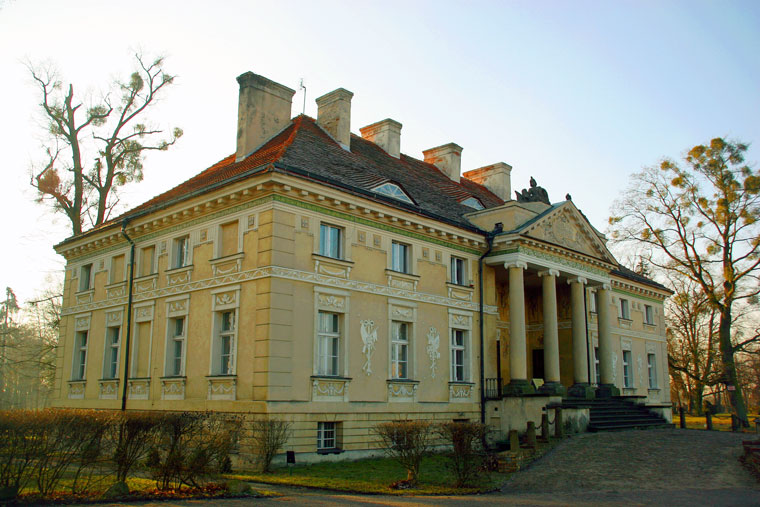
Classicist Lipski Palace in Lewków.

The first mention of Lewków comes from 1403. For a long time, the village was owned by the Koźmiński family, but in the 18th century it often changed owners (Sokolniccy, Gorzeńscy, Krzyżanowski). In 1786, purchased by Wojciech Lipski of the Grabie coat of arms (noble coat of arms), adjutant of King Stanisław August Poniatowski. In the 1840s, the poet Roman Zmorski hid here, with Józef Lipski. It remained in the hands of the Lipski family until the outbreak of World War II. In 1928, Lewków was visited by President Ignacy Mościcki. The last pre-war owners of Lewków were Jan Lipski and his brother, Józef Lipski, the last ambassador of the Polish-Lithuanian Commonwealth in Berlin (1934–1939).

Postman Ludwik Danielak was baptized in Lewków in 1909 in the church of St. Saint Wojciech. His father, Walenty Danielak, lived in Lewków in the years 1916–1924 and then was a councillor of Zduny, a social activist known in the region. In September 1939, Ludwik Danielak performed tasks for the state's defence. He died on September 7 near the village of Modlna and was shot by Wehrmacht soldiers: the 31st Infantry Regiment of the 24th German Division. He was in a postman's uniform and had no weapon. He organized scouting in Zduny and the surrounding area of Baszków in the years 1925–1931.

Before 1887, the town belonged administratively to the Odolanów district. In the years 1954–1972, the village belonged to and was the seat of the authorities of the Lewków community. in the years 1975–1998 to the Kalisz Voivodeship, and in the years 1887–1975 and from 1999 to the Ostrów County.

== Monuments ==
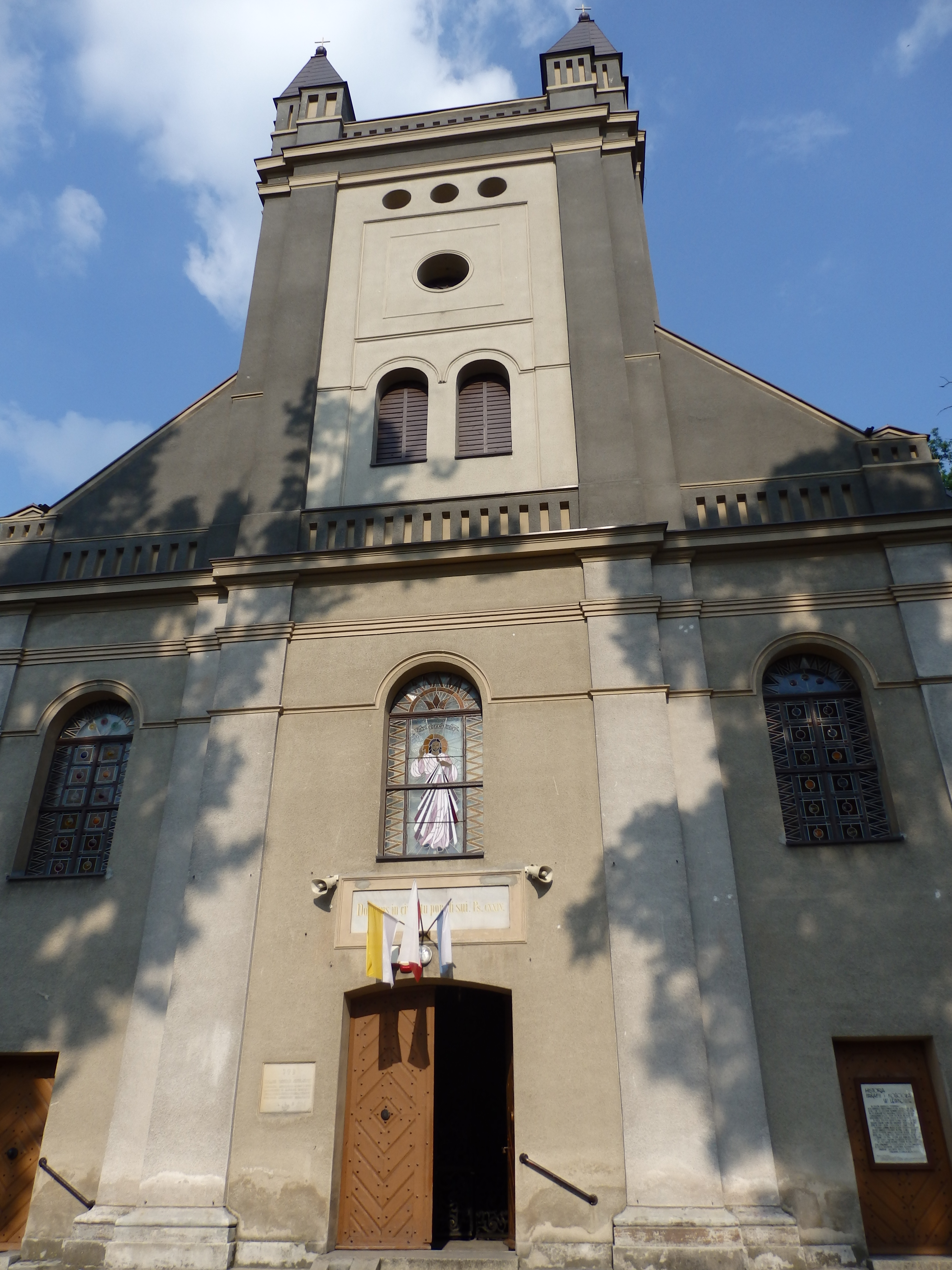
Church of St. Wojciech

- Lipski Palace from 1788-91. The Palace Museum reopened after renovation in 2022.
- Church of St. Wojciech, built in 1844–1846 on the site of the previous wooden temple, funded by Salomea Lipska and her grandson Wojciech Lipski, eclectic with neo-Renaissance interior furnishings from 1871–1872,
  - Altar with a painting of St. Anna Samotrzeć with St. Jan, a copy of a painting by Bartolome Murillo made by Leon Kapliński,
  - Chancel with polychrome from the 19th century, stucco walls and a marble tabernacle,
  - Wrought iron grate at the passage from the porch to the church, decorated with a Regency-style ornament with the date 1732 and the initials of the Ołobok abbess Katarzyna Pawłowska, purchased in 1817 from the Cistercian church in Ołobok,
  - The church tomb of the Lipski family with the inscription: To Wojciech Lipski 1805-1855, democrat and politician, fighter for Poland's independence, creator of the junior high school in Ostrów on the 125th anniversary of 1845-1970,
  - Church cemetery with monumental trees and two erratic boulders connected in the shape of a table, measuring 1.7 by 1 m in total,
  - Wall with decorative vases and figures.
