= Papiernia, Gmina Odolanów =

Papiernia
- Settlement
- Location within Poland
- Coordinates: 51°34′39″N 17°46′05″E
- Country: Poland
- Voivodeship: Greater Poland
- County: Ostrów
- Gmina: Odolanów

Papiernia [paˈpjɛrɲa] is a settlement in the administrative district of Gmina Odolanów, within Ostrów County, Greater Poland Voivodeship, in west-central Poland.
