= Boników =

- Village
- Location within Poland
- Coordinates: 51°33′N 17°40′E
- Country: Poland
- Voivodeship: Greater Poland
- County: Ostrów
- Gmina: Odolanów
- Population: 500

Boników [bɔˈnikuf] is a village in the administrative district of Gmina Odolanów, within Ostrów County, Greater Poland Voivodeship, in west-central Poland.
