= Berthold Kempinski =

Prussian wine merchant (1843–1910)

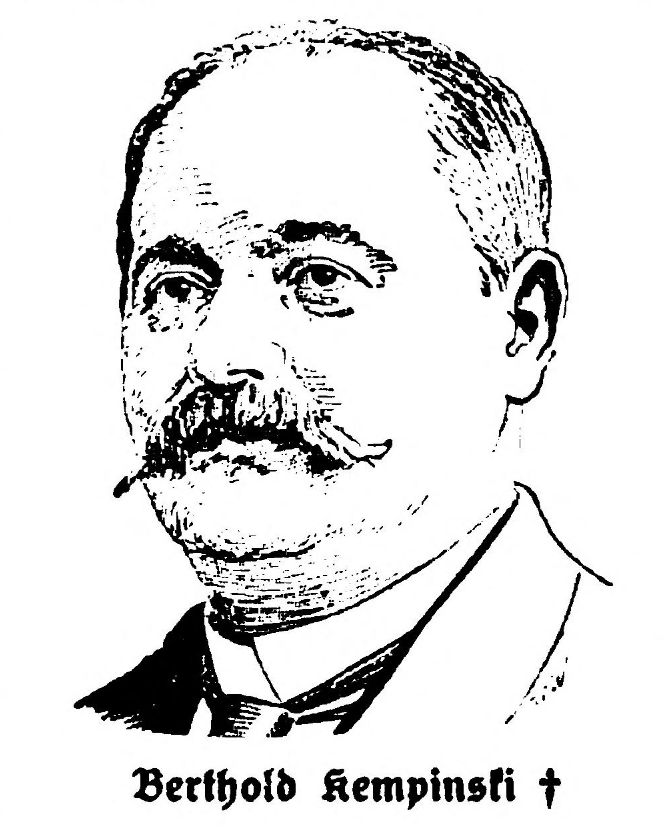
- Kempinski in 1910
- Born: 10 October 1843; Raschkow, Grand Duchy of Posen, Kingdom of Prussia (Raszków, Poland)
- Died: 14 March 1910 (aged 66); Berlin, German Empire
- Known for: Founding Kempinski hotels
- Spouse: Helene Heß (1855–1932)
- Children: Frieda Kempinski

Berthold Kempinski (10 October 1843 – 14 March 1910) was a Polish Prussian wine merchant, restaurateur and hotelier.

== Biography ==
Kempinski was born in Raschkow, Grand Duchy of Posen, Kingdom of Prussia (Raszków, Poland), he became a travelling salesman in winetrade in his home region. Kempinski and his younger brother operated a wine tavern at the Ring (Market Square) of Breslau (Wrocław). In 1872 he moved to Berlin and started a small premise at Kronenstraße and soon after the M. Kempinski & Co. wine restaurant at Friedrichstraße / Leipziger Straße junction.

The restaurant became popular for its huge selection of wine and seasonal delicacies like oysters and crayfish. Kempinski invented the table d'hôte for a fixed price (1,25 Mark) and the "half portion" for (0,75 Mark, later 0,85 Mark) which made fine dining affordable for the middle-class population.

In 1889 the Kempinski restaurant at Leipziger Straße 25 was opened, the largest business of its kind in Berlin. Wilhelm II selected the mayolica tiles from his Cadiner Majolika manufactury and attended the opening of the Kaisersaal (Emperor's hall). Kempinski later specialised on wine trading and devolved the management to his son in law and his nephew.

Kempinski died 14 March 1910 in Berlin and was buried in an honorary grave at the Jewish Weißensee cemetery. In an obituary the Berliner Tageblatt called him one of the most popular men of Berlin.

Berthold Kempinski is seen as the founder of the Kempinski brand of luxury hotels.

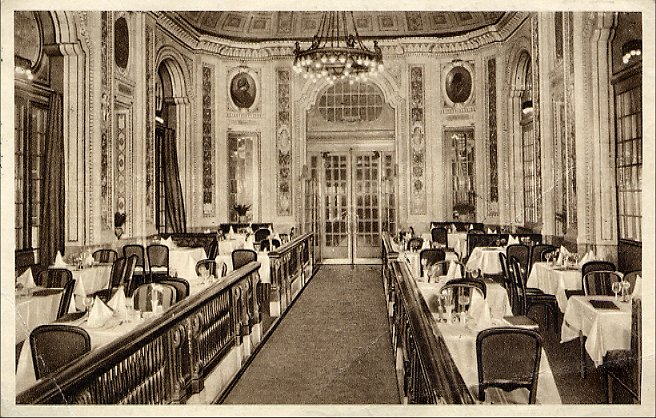
The Cadiner Saal at Kempinski's, Berlin

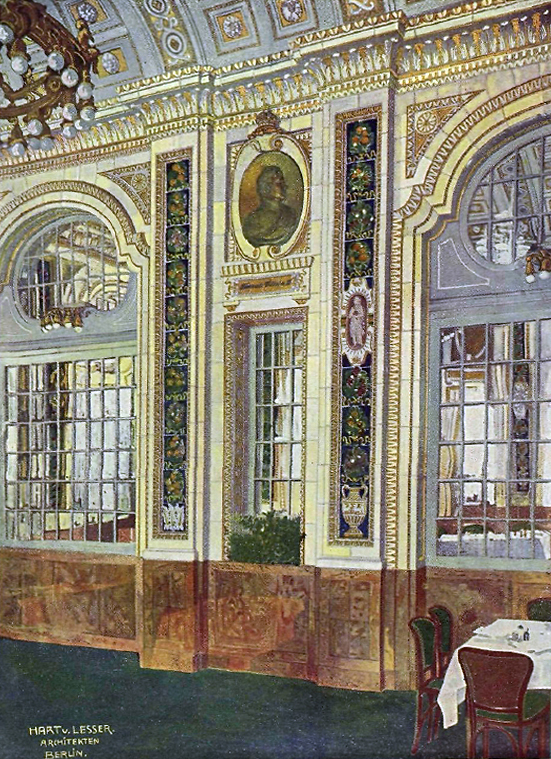
Interior of Weinhaus Kempinski

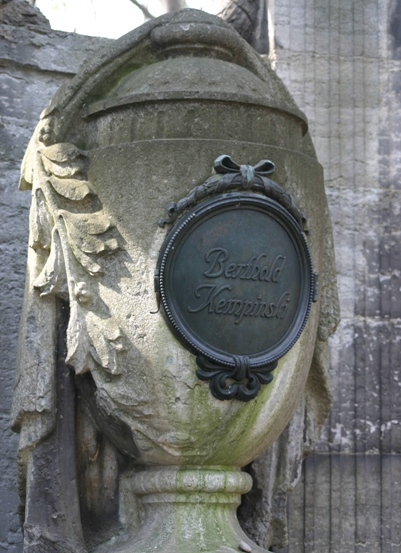
Kempinski's grave at Weissensee Cemetery
