= Paweł Bryliński =

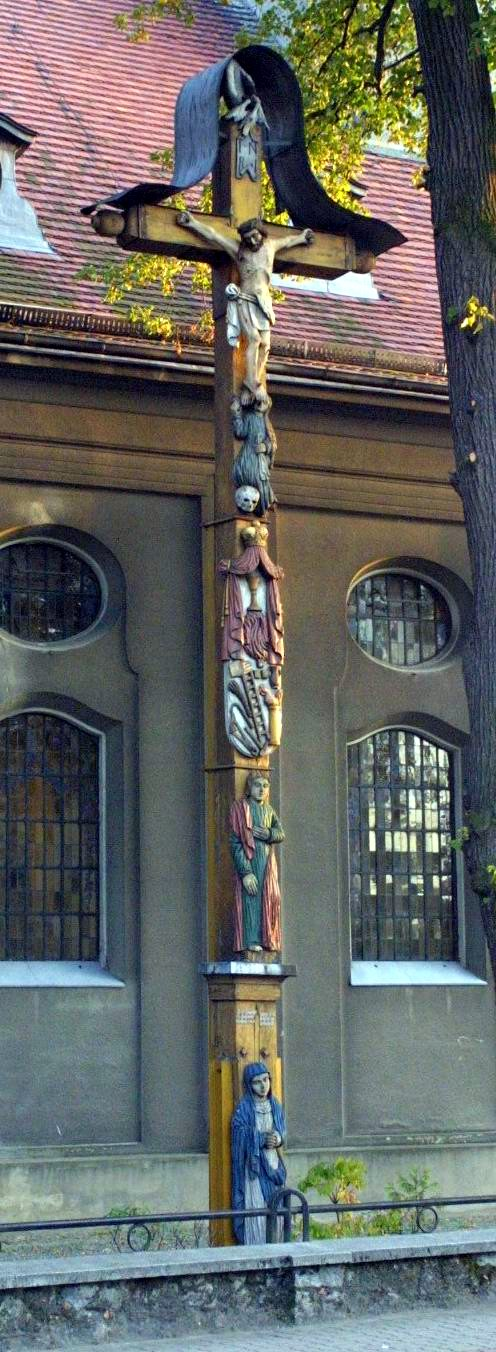
An example of Paweł Bryliński's work

Paweł Bryliński (21 June 1814 in Wieruszów – 18 April 1890 in Masanów) was a Polish folk-sculptor. He is perhaps best known for a series of works concerning Holy Week.

== Bibliography ==
- Patricia M. Cmielewski (Patricia Margaret), 1921-2014 "Paweł Bryliński : a wandering folk sculptor 1814-1890", Bondi, N.S.W, 2006, ISBN 0646459821
- Ewa Chmielewska, "Święci na polskich rozstajach - południowa Wielkopolska", Ostrów Wlkp./Latowice, 2002.
