= Bilczew, Gmina Sieroszewice =

Bilczew
- Village
- Location within Poland
- Coordinates: 51°40′N 17°58′E
- Country: Poland
- Voivodeship: Greater Poland
- County: Ostrów
- Gmina: Sieroszewice
- Elevation: 120 m (390 ft)
- Population: 53

Bilczew [ˈbilt͡ʂɛf] is a village in the administrative district of Gmina Sieroszewice, within Ostrów County, Greater Poland Voivodeship, in west-central Poland.
