= Anna Jasińska =

Polish activist and politician

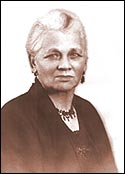
- Born: 10 July 1867; Raszków, Province of Posen, Prussia (Poland)
- Died: 7 October 1957 (aged 90); Wrocław, Poland
- Occupations: washerwoman, Polonia activist

Anna Jasińska (10 July 1867 – 7 October 1957) was a washerwoman, Polonia activist connected with Wrocław (Breslau).

She was born in Raszków, where she finished school. At the end of 19th century she moved to Wrocław and soon, at the beginning of the 20th century, began working at many Polonia organizations (Polish-Catholic Society, Polish Merchant Society, Polish Women Society, „Harmony” Singing Club). Before 1939 she owned a washhouse, dividing the income between donations for Dom Polski (Polish House), equipping and running a dormitory for Polish youth Studying at the University of Breslau and caring for a scout team. In 1929 she ran as a candidate of Polish Mieterpartei (Polish Party of Tenants) in elections for the Wrocław City Council.

During the World War II she helped Poles imprisoned in German forced labor camps.

As a pre-war inhabitant, she was not granted material support in Polish People's Republic. She was buried on the Saint Lawrence cemetery in Wrocław in a modest grave far from the main alley.

== Orders and decorations ==
- Odznaka Wiary i Wytrwania (Badge of Faith and Perseverance) – 1938
- Commander's Cross of Order of Polonia Restituta (posthumously)

== Commemoration ==
- She is a patron of the Primary School number 63 at Mennicza Street.
- A street in Wrocław, in Jerzmanowo district, is named after her.
