= Standesamt Adelnau =

Standesamt Adelnau was one of the civil registration districts located in Kreis Adelnau of the Prussian province of Posen, created in October 1874, during Imperial Germany (1871–1918) and administered the communities of:

Community	Polish spelling	1895 Pop	Prot	Cath	Jew	Other
Adelnau	Odolanów

== Historical Overview ==
=== 1. Administrative and Historical Context ===
The Standesamt (civil registry office) in Adelnau was part of the German system of civil registration established in the late 19th century. Adelnau was a town in the Prussian Province of Posen (now Odolanów, Poland). After the partitions of Poland, the region was under Prussian control and later became part of the German Empire in 1871.

Civil registry offices (Standesämter) were introduced in Prussia in 1874 to keep official records of births, marriages, and deaths. These records were essential for legal identity, inheritance, and citizenship matters.

=== 2. Function of Standesamt Adelnau ===
Like other civil registry offices in Prussia, Standesamt Adelnau was responsible for:

- Registering births, including parental details.
- Recording marriages and issuing marriage certificates.
- Documenting deaths and related legal matters.
- Maintaining accurate population records.

These records were vital for both local governance and broader administrative functions within the German Empire and later under Polish control after World War I.

=== 3. Historical Changes and Transition ===
- Pre-1918: Under German administration as part of the province of Posen.
- 1919-1939: Following World War I and the Treaty of Versailles, Adelnau (now Odolanów) became part of Poland, and the civil registry system transitioned to Polish administration.
- 1939-1945: Under Nazi German occupation during World War II, the area temporarily reverted to German control, and Standesamt functions resumed under German law.
- Post-1945: After World War II, Adelnau officially remained in Poland, and the civil registry system became fully integrated into Polish administration.

=== 4. Legacy and Records ===
Many historical records from Standesamt Adelnau may be found in:

- Polish state archives (e.g., Archiwum Państwowe w Poznaniu).
- German archives (e.g., Bundesarchiv, Standesamt I in Berlin for displaced records).
- Genealogical databases such as FamilySearch and the Poznan Project.

These records are valuable for historical and genealogical research, particularly for individuals tracing ancestry in the former province of Posen.
