= Łąkociny, Greater Poland Voivodeship =

Łąkociny
- Village
- Location within Poland
- Coordinates: 51°39′30″N 17°40′2″E
- Country: Poland
- Voivodeship: Greater Poland
- County: Ostrów
- Gmina: Ostrów Wielkopolski
- Population: 800

Łąkociny [wɔnkɔˈt͡ɕinɨ] is a village in the administrative district of Gmina Ostrów Wielkopolski, within Ostrów County, Greater Poland Voivodeship, in west-central Poland.
