= Kąkolewo, Gmina Ostrów Wielkopolski =

Kąkolewo
- Settlement
- Location within Poland
- Coordinates: 51°39′42″N 17°52′47″E
- Country: Poland
- Voivodeship: Greater Poland
- County: Ostrów
- Gmina: Ostrów Wielkopolski
- Population: 4

Kąkolewo [kɔnkɔˈlɛvɔ] is a settlement in the administrative district of Gmina Ostrów Wielkopolski, within Ostrów County, Greater Poland Voivodeship, in west-central Poland.
