= Przygodzice =

- Village
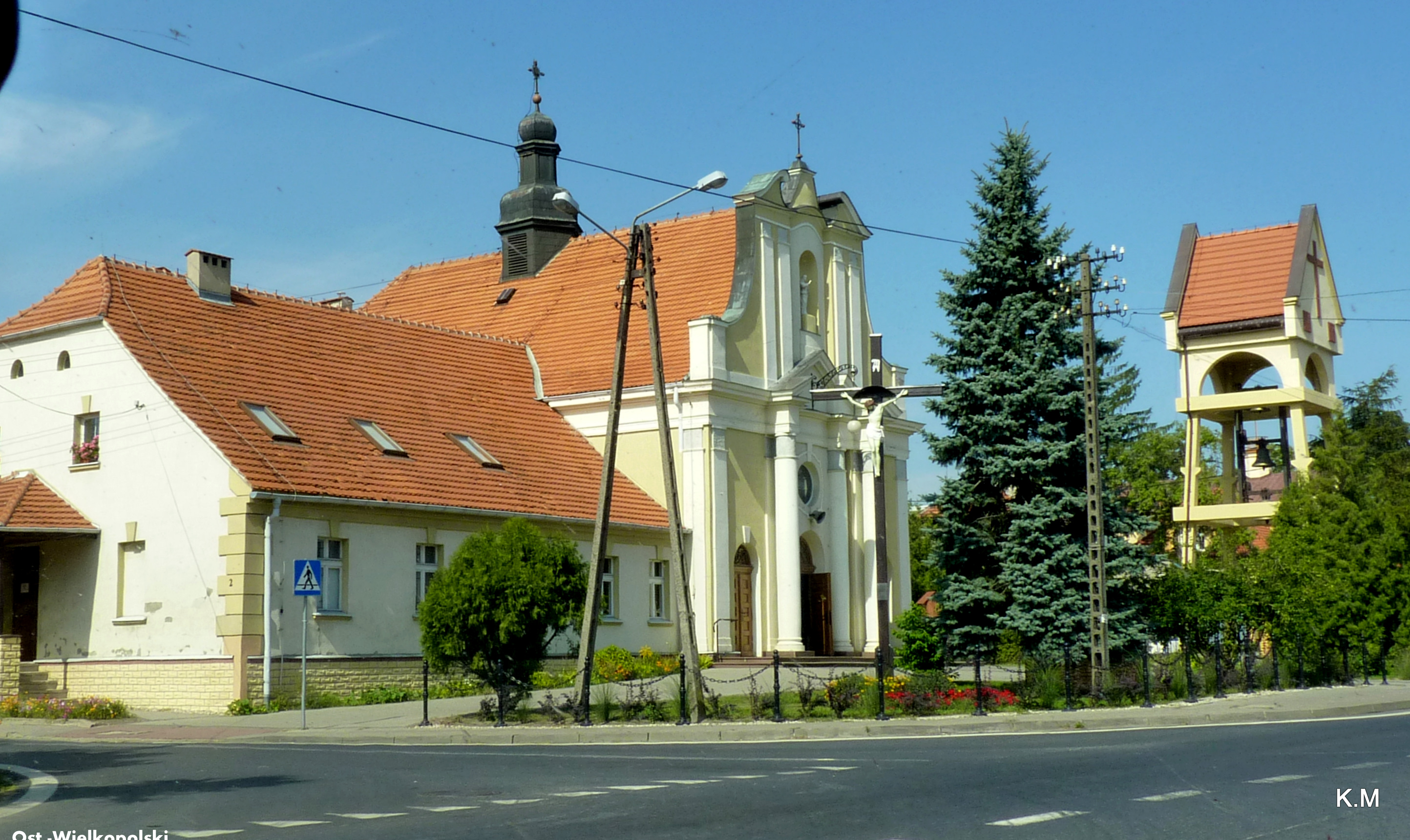
- Church of Our Lady of Perpetual Help

- Location within Poland
- Coordinates: 51°35′N 17°50′E
- Country: Poland
- Voivodeship: Greater Poland
- County: Ostrów
- Gmina: Przygodzice

Population
  - Total: 3,000
- Time zone: UTC+1 (CET)
  - Summer (DST): UTC+2 (CEST)
- Vehicle registration: POS

Przygodzice [pʂɨɡɔˈd͡ʑit͡sɛ] is a village in Ostrów County, Greater Poland Voivodeship, in west-central Poland. It is the seat of the gmina (administrative district) called Gmina Przygodzice.

== History ==
Przygodzice was a private village of Polish nobility, administratively located in the Kalisz County in the Kalisz Voivodeship in the Greater Poland Province of the Kingdom of Poland.

According to the 1921 Polish census, the population was 98.5% Polish.

Following the joint German-Soviet invasion of Poland, which started World War II in September 1939, the village was occupied by Germany until 1945. In 1942, the German gendarmerie carried out expulsions of Poles, whose houses and farms were then handed over to German colonists as part of the Lebensraum policy. Expelled Poles were either enslaved as forced labour of new German colonists in the county of deported to the General Government in the more-eastern part of German-occupied Poland. The Polish resistance was active in Przygodzice. Ignacy Misiek, commander of the local unit of the Home Army, was arrested by the Gestapo in Raszków on 6 November 1944, and then detained in the Radogoszcz prison, where he died.
