= Sieroszewice =

- Village
- Location within Poland
- Coordinates: 51°37′59″N 17°58′17″E
- Country: Poland
- Voivodeship: Greater Poland
- County: Ostrów
- Gmina: Sieroszewice
- Population: 1,014

Sieroszewice ([ɕɛrɔʂɛˈvit͡sɛ]) is a village in Ostrów County, Greater Poland Voivodeship, in west-central Poland. It is the seat of the gmina (administrative district) called Gmina Sieroszewice.
