= Raszków =

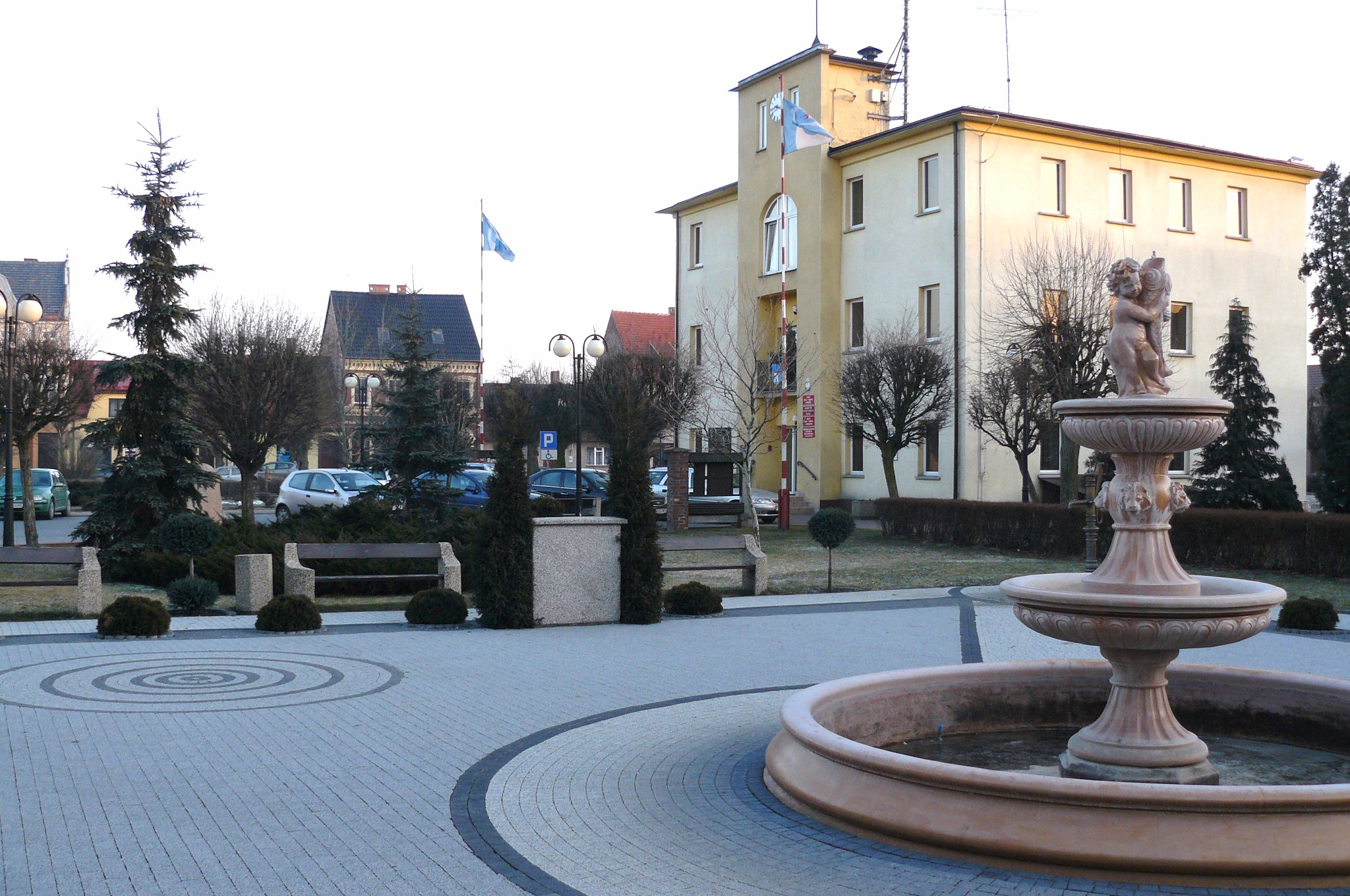
- Rynek (Market Square) in Raszków

- Coat of arms

- Location within Poland
- Coordinates: 51°43′00″N 17°43′35″E
- Country: Poland
- Voivodeship: Greater Poland
- County: Ostrów
- Gmina: Raszków
- Town rights: 1444

Area
  - Total: 1.77 km^{2} (0.68 sq mi)

Population (2010)
  - Total: 2,080
  - Density: 1,180/km^{2} (3,040/sq mi)
- Time zone: UTC+1 (CET)
  - Summer (DST): UTC+2 (CEST)
- Postal code: 63-440
- Vehicle registration: POS
- Climate: Cfb
- Website: http://www.raszkow.pl/

Raszków [ˈraʂkuf] is a town in Ostrów County, Greater Poland Voivodeship, Poland, with 2,080 inhabitants (2010).

== History ==
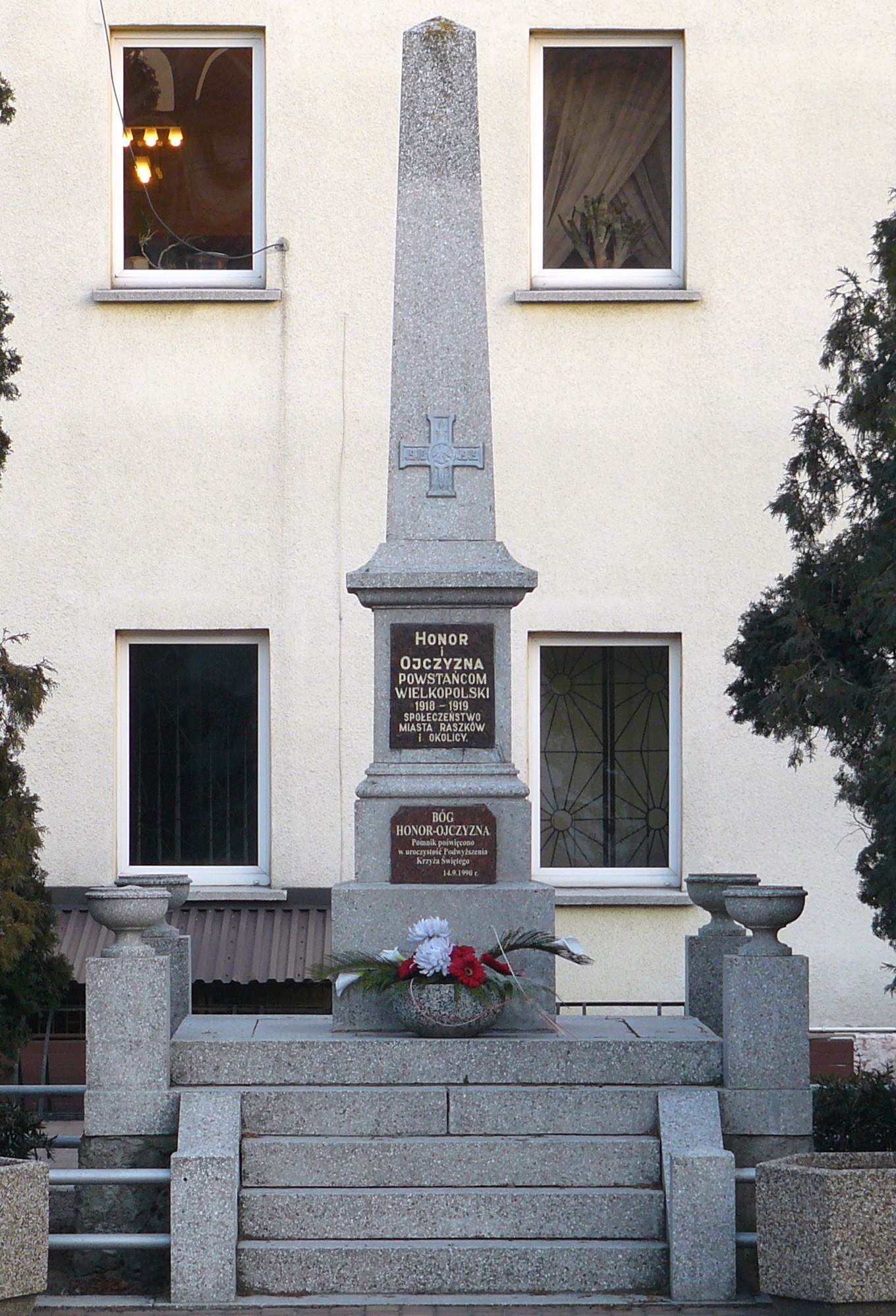
Greater Poland uprising (1918–1919) memorial

Raszków was granted town rights in 1444. It was a private town, administratively located in the Kalisz County in the Kalisz Voivodeship in the Greater Poland Province of the Kingdom of Poland.

After the Second Partition of Poland in 1793, the town was annexed by the Kingdom of Prussia, within which it became part of the newly formed province of South Prussia. Regained by Poles after the successful Greater Poland uprising of 1806, it was included in the short-lived Polish Duchy of Warsaw, and in 1815 it was re-annexed by Prussia, within which it was part of the initially semi-autonomous Grand Duchy of Poznań and later of the Province of Posen. The Jewish population of the town was 214 people in 1839, but by 1905 it had dropped to 84 people, comprising 5% of the total population of 1,658. After the end of the First World War, Raszków became part of Poznań Voivodeship, in reborn Poland.

Following the joint German-Soviet invasion of Poland, which started World War II in September 1939, the town was occupied by Germany until 1945. In October and December 1939, the occupiers carried out the first expulsions of Poles, families of officials and owners of larger houses and workshops, which were then handed over to German colonists as part of the Lebensraum policy. Expelled Poles were deported to transit camps in Nowe Skalmierzyce and Mikstat, and then to the General Government in the more-eastern part of German-occupied Poland. The Polish resistance was active in Raszków. In November 1944, the commander of the Przygodzice unit of the Home Army, was arrested by the Gestapo in Raszków.

From 1975 to 1998, Raszków belonged to the Kalisz Voivodeship.

== Demographics ==
Historical population

Year	Pop.	±%
1871	1,422	—
1880	1,473	+3.6%
1890	1,521	+3.3%
1905	1,658	+9.0%
1921	1,672	+0.8%

Year	Pop.	±%
1931	1,692	+1.2%
1939	1,782	+5.3%
1950	1,239	−30.5%
1960	1,304	+5.2%
2010	2,080	+59.5%

== Notable residents ==
- Berthold Kempinski (1843-1910), German hotelier
- Anna Jasińska (1867-1957), Polish activist
- Jan Bajoński (1888-1940), Polish gynaecologist, military officer, victim of the Katyn massacre during World War II
- Marian Kołodziej (1921-2009), Polish artist, scenic designer, prisoner of Nazi German concentration camps during World War II
- Tobiasz Pawlak (born 1995), Polish cyclist
