= Ostrów County, Greater Poland Voivodeship =

Ostrów County Powiat ostrowski
- County
- Flag Coat of arms

- Location within the voivodeship
- Coordinates (Ostrów Wielkopolski): 51°39′N 17°42′E
- Country: Poland
- Voivodeship: Greater Poland
- Seat: Ostrów Wielkopolski
- Gminas: Total 8 (incl. 1 urban): Ostrów Wielkopolski; Gmina Nowe Skalmierzyce; Gmina Odolanów; Gmina Ostrów Wielkopolski; Gmina Przygodzice; Gmina Raszków; Gmina Sieroszewice; Gmina Sośnie

Area
  - Total: 1,160.65 km^{2} (448.13 sq mi)

Population (2006)
  - Total: 158,407
  - Density: 136.481/km^{2} (353.485/sq mi)
  - Urban: 84,654
  - Rural: 73,753
- Car plates: POS
- Website: http://www.powiat-ostrowski.pl

Ostrów County (Polish: powiat ostrowski) is a unit of territorial administration and local government (powiat) in Greater Poland Voivodeship, west-central Poland. It came into being on January 1, 1999, as a result of the Polish local government reforms passed in 1998. Its administrative seat and largest town is Ostrów Wielkopolski, which lies 100 kilometres (62 mi) south-east of the regional capital Poznań. The county contains three other towns: Nowe Skalmierzyce, 22 km (14 mi) east of Ostrów Wielkopolski, Odolanów, 10 km (6 mi) south of Ostrów Wielkopolski, and Raszków, 8 km (5 mi) north of Ostrów Wielkopolski.

The county covers an area of 1,160.65 square kilometres (448.1 sq mi). As of 2020, its total population is 161,581. In 2006 the population of Ostrów Wielkopolski was 72,577, that of Nowe Skalmierzyce 5,080, that of Odolanów 4,960, that of Raszków 2,037, and the rural population was 73,753.

== Neighbouring counties ==
Ostrów County is bordered by Pleszew County to the north, the city of Kalisz and Kalisz County to the east, Ostrzeszów County to the south-east, Oleśnica County to the south-west, and Milicz County and Krotoszyn County to the west.

== Administrative divisions ==
The county is subdivided into eight gminas (one urban, three urban-rural and four rural). These are listed in the following table, in descending order of population.

Gmina	Type	Area (km^{2})	Population (2020)	Seat
Ostrów Wielkopolski	urban	42.4	71,931	
Gmina Ostrów Wielkopolski	rural	207.0	19,147	Ostrów Wielkopolski *
Gmina Nowe Skalmierzyce	urban-rural	125.7	15,563	Skalmierzyce
Gmina Odolanów	urban-rural	136.0	14,655	Odolanów
Gmina Przygodzice	rural	163.5	12,179	Przygodzice
Gmina Raszków	urban-rural	134.5	11,894	Raszków
Gmina Sieroszewice	rural	163.5	9,684	Sieroszewice
Gmina Sośnie	rural	187.5	6,573	Sośnie
* seat not part of the gmina
