= Koliada (disambiguation) =

Koliada, Koleda or Kolyada or Kolęda can refer to:

- Koliada, a pre-Christian Slavic winter ritual
- Koliada (deity), in Slavic mythology, a pagan god, impersonating the newborn Sun.
- Kolęda, Lower Silesian Voivodeship, a village in Poland.
- Kolyada (surname)
- Koleda, the Bulgarian word for Christmas.
- Kalėdos, the Lithuanian word for Christmas.
