= Neuschloss =

Neuschloss (Neuschloß), German for 'new castle', can refer to:

Germany

- Neuschloss (Lampertheim), a community in the town of Lampertheim, Germany

Estonia

- Vasknarva

Poland

- Nowy Zamek

Czech Republic

- Nové Hrady (Ústí nad Orlicí District), a village in the Czech Republic

Romania

- Gherla (Hungarian: Szamosújvár (Szamos-Újvár), Örményváros), a city in Romania

== See also ==
- Neuburg (disambiguation)
- Nové Hrady (disambiguation)
