= Borzynowo =

Borzynowo may refer to the following places in Poland:

- Borzynowo, Lower Silesian Voivodeship (south-west Poland)
- Borzynowo, Warmian-Masurian Voivodeship (north Poland)
