= Grabownica, Gmina Milicz =

Grabownica
- Village
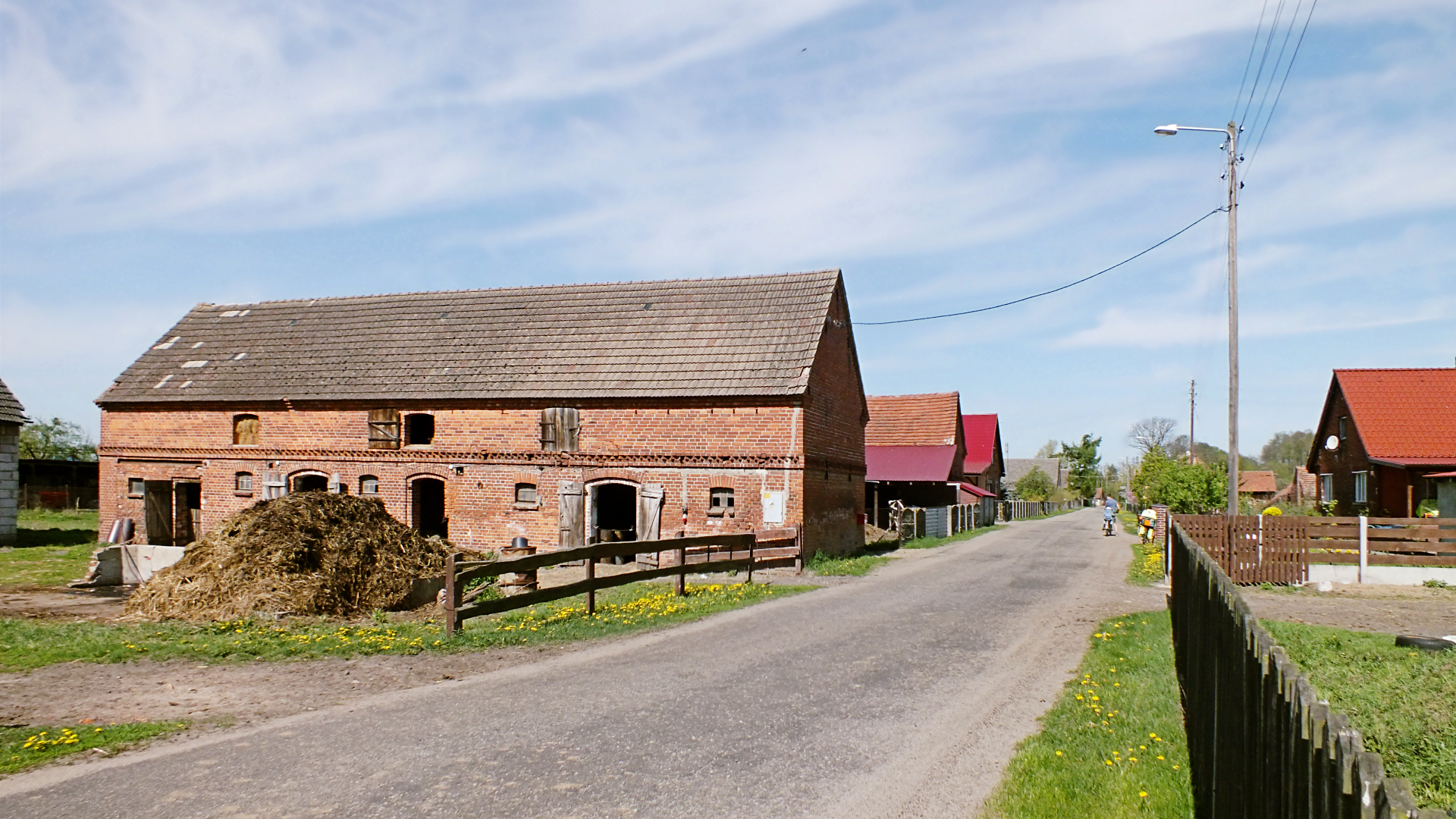

- Location within Poland
- Coordinates: 51°31′56″N 17°22′42″E
- Country: Poland
- Voivodeship: Lower Silesian
- County: Milicz
- Gmina: Milicz

Grabownica [ɡrabɔvˈnit͡sa] is a village in the administrative district of Gmina Milicz, within Milicz County, Lower Silesian Voivodeship, in south-western Poland.
