= Duchowo =

- Village
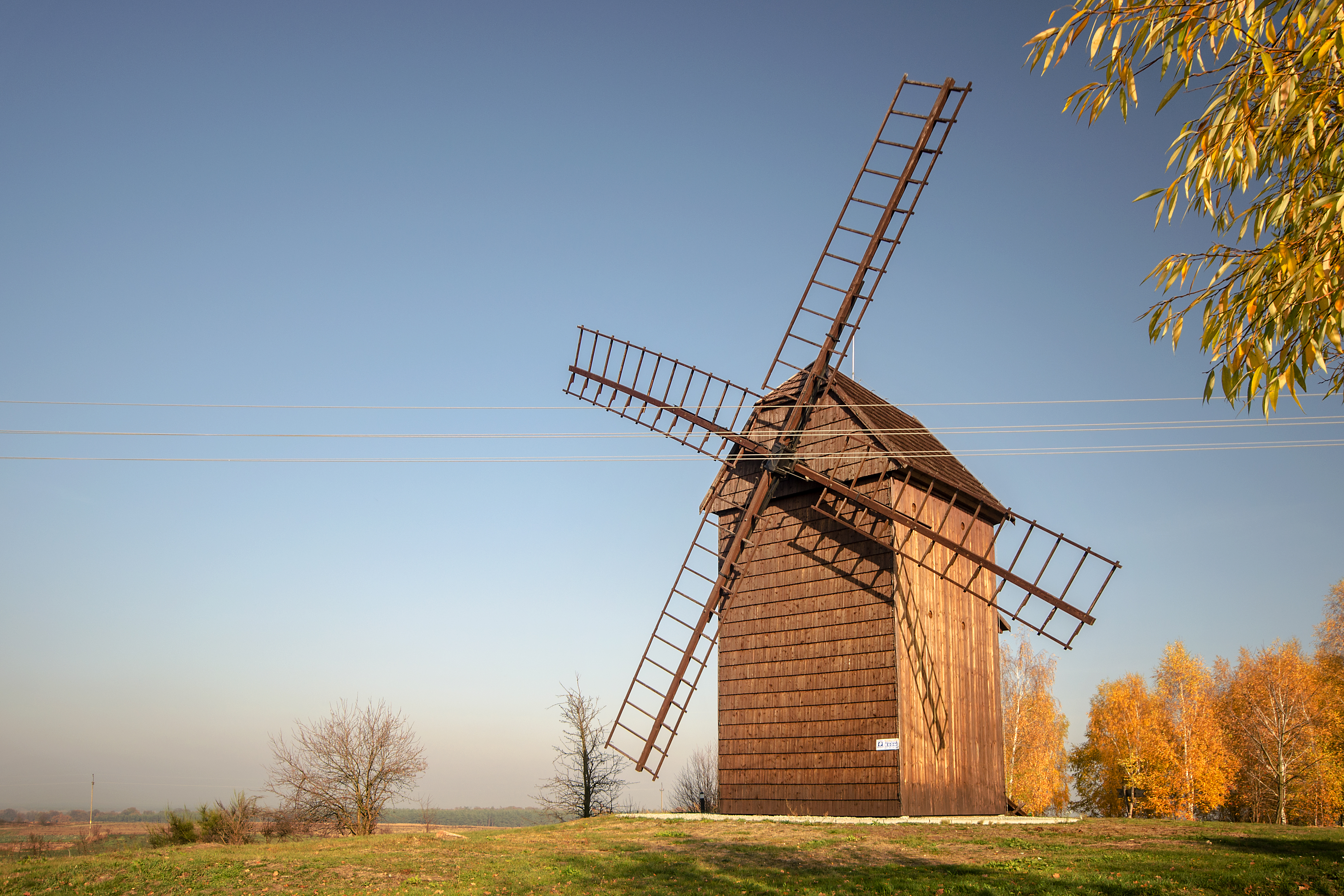
- Windmill

- Location within Poland
- Coordinates: 51°31′05″N 17°19′03″E
- Country: Poland
- Voivodeship: Lower Silesian
- County: Milicz
- Gmina: Milicz

Duchowo [duˈxɔvɔ] (German: Duchawe) is a village in the administrative district of Gmina Milicz, within Milicz County, Lower Silesian Voivodeship, in south-western Poland.
