= Wziąchowo Małe =

- Village
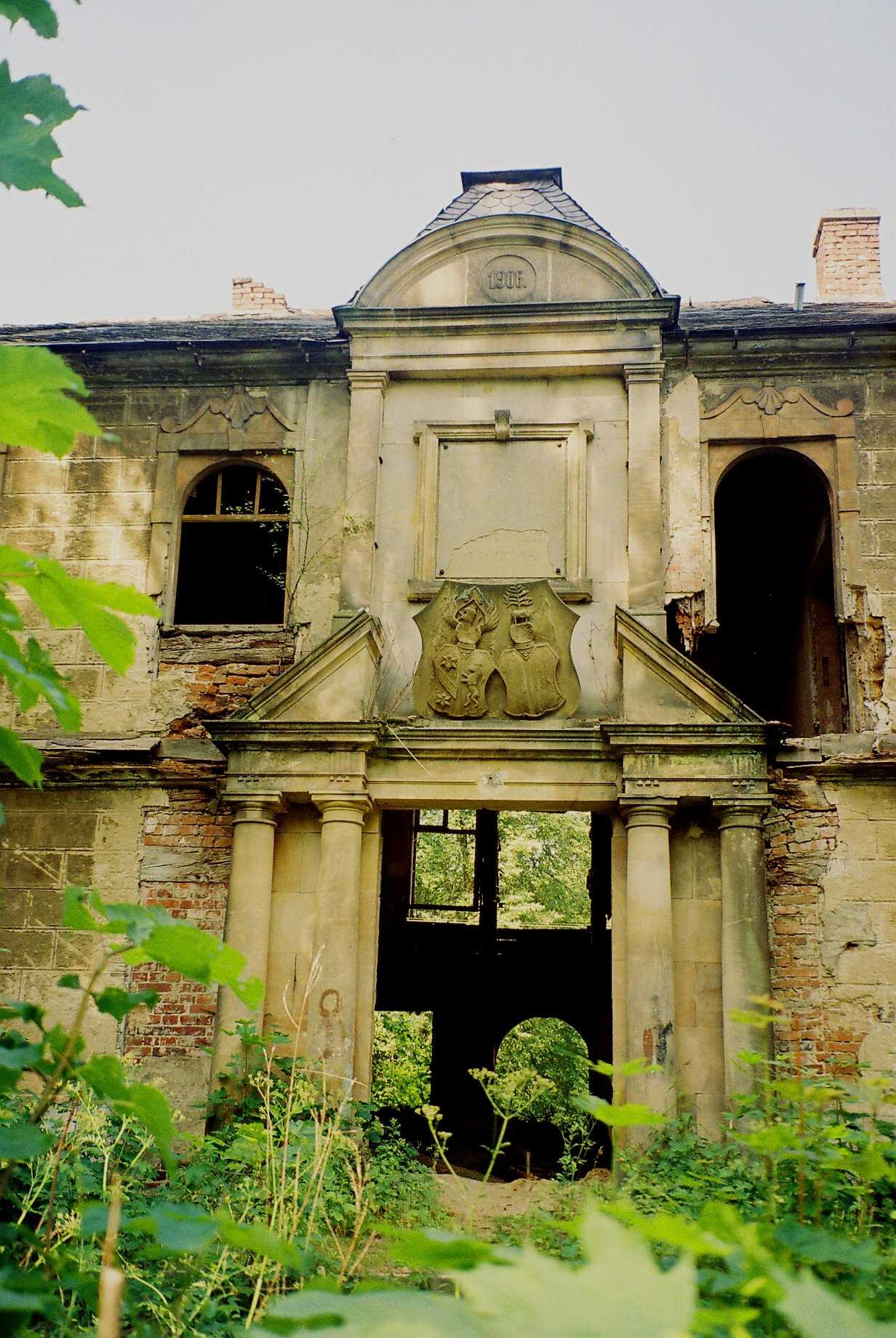
- Palace

- Location within Poland
- Coordinates: 51°35′24″N 17°26′20″E
- Country: Poland
- Voivodeship: Lower Silesian
- County: Milicz
- Gmina: Milicz
- Population: 113

Wziąchowo Małe [vʑɔ̃ˈxɔvɔ ˈmawɛ] is a village in the administrative district of Gmina Milicz, within Milicz County, Lower Silesian Voivodeship, in south-western Poland. The town has 113 residents as of the 2021 Polish Census.
