= Ruda Sułowska =

- Village
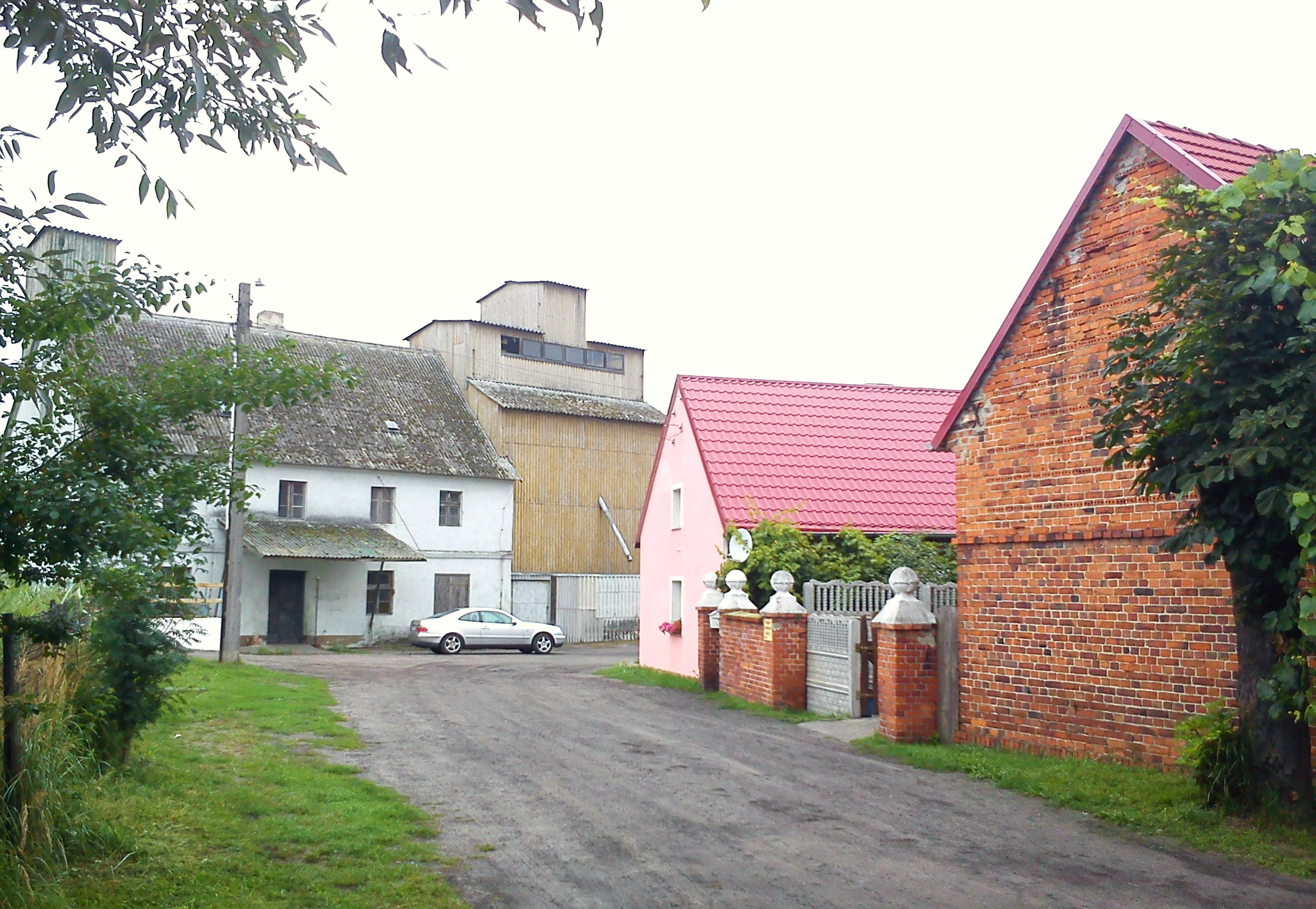

- Location within Poland
- Coordinates: 51°30′N 17°7′E
- Country: Poland
- Voivodeship: Lower Silesian
- County: Milicz
- Gmina: Milicz

Ruda Sułowska [ˈruda suˈwɔfska] is a village in the administrative district of Gmina Milicz, within Milicz County, Lower Silesian Voivodeship, in south-western Poland.
