= Postel =

Postel is a surname, and may refer to:

- Guillaume Postel (1510–1581), French linguist, astronomer, Cabbalist, diplomat, and religious universalist
- Christian Heinrich Postel (1658–1705), German jurist, poet and opera librettist
- Georg-Wilhelm Postel, World War II German general
- Gert Postel, German impostor
- Jon Postel, Internet pioneer
- Kaitlynne Postel, competitor for Miss America 2008
- Sandra Postel, founder of the Global Water Policy Project

== Other ==
Postel is a village in the Mol municipality in Belgium, the location of Postel Abbey

Postel is the former German name of Postolin, Lower Silesian Voivodeship, Poland

== See also ==
- Postell, surname
- Postol, surname
