= Piękocin =

- Village
- Location within Poland
- Coordinates: 51°32′51″N 17°12′02″E
- Country: Poland
- Voivodeship: Lower Silesian
- County: Milicz
- Gmina: Milicz

Piękocin [pjɛŋˈkɔt͡ɕin] is a village in the administrative district of Gmina Milicz, within Milicz County, Lower Silesian Voivodeship, in south-western Poland.
