= Gogołowice, Milicz County =

Gogołowice
- Village
- Location within Poland
- Coordinates: 51°34′02″N 17°14′40″E
- Country: Poland
- Voivodeship: Lower Silesian
- County: Milicz
- Gmina: Milicz

Gogołowice [ɡɔɡɔwɔˈvit͡sɛ] is a village in the administrative district of Gmina Milicz, within Milicz County, Lower Silesian Voivodeship, in south-western Poland.
