= Postol =

Postol is a surname. Notable people with the surname include:

- Sidney Postol (1918–2014), American businessman and politician
- Theodore Postol (born 1946), American professor emeritus of Science, Technology, and International Security
- Viktor Postol (born 1984), Ukrainian boxer

== See also ==
- Pella (town), town in Greece; also known as "Postol"
- Postel, surname
- Postell, surname
