= Czatkowice =

Czatkowice may refer to:

- Czatkowice, Lesser Poland Voivodeship in Gmina Krzeszowice, in Kraków County, Lesser Poland Voivodeship (S Poland)
- Czatkowice, Lower Silesian Voivodeship in Gmina Milicz, Milicz County in Lower Silesian Voivodeship (SW Poland)
