= Grabówka, Lower Silesian Voivodeship =

Grabówka
- Village
- Location within Poland
- Coordinates: 51°31′19″N 17°04′53″E
- Country: Poland
- Voivodeship: Lower Silesian
- County: Milicz
- Gmina: Milicz

Grabówka [ɡraˈbufka] is a village in the administrative district of Gmina Milicz, within Milicz County, Lower Silesian Voivodeship, in south-western Poland.
