= Poradów, Lower Silesian Voivodeship =

Poradów
- Village
- Location within Poland
- Coordinates: 51°34′17″N 17°10′48″E
- Country: Poland
- Voivodeship: Lower Silesian
- County: Milicz
- Gmina: Milicz

Poradów [pɔˈraduf] is a village in the administrative district of Gmina Milicz, within Milicz County, Lower Silesian Voivodeship, in south-western Poland.
