= Wilkowo, Lower Silesian Voivodeship =

Wilkowo
- Village
- Location within Poland
- Coordinates: 51°32′24″N 17°02′53″E
- Country: Poland
- Voivodeship: Lower Silesian
- County: Milicz
- Gmina: Milicz

Wilkowo [vilˈkɔvɔ] is a village in the administrative district of Gmina Milicz, within Milicz County, Lower Silesian Voivodeship, in south-western Poland.
