= Wrocławice =

- Village
- Location within Poland
- Coordinates: 51°34′23″N 17°30′36″E
- Country: Poland
- Voivodeship: Lower Silesian
- County: Milicz
- Gmina: Milicz

Wrocławice (Polish pronunciation: [vrɔt͡swaˈvit͡sɛ]) is a village in the administrative district of Gmina Milicz, within Milicz County, Lower Silesian Voivodeship, in south-western Poland.
