= Baranowice, Milicz County =

Baranowice
- Village
- Location within Poland
- Coordinates: 51°33′54″N 17°04′24″E
- Country: Poland
- Voivodeship: Lower Silesian
- County: Milicz
- Gmina: Milicz

Baranowice [baranɔˈvit͡sɛ] is a village in the administrative district of Gmina Milicz, within Milicz County, Lower Silesian Voivodeship, in south-western Poland.
