= Sulimierz, Lower Silesian Voivodeship =

Sulimierz
- Village
- Location within Poland
- Coordinates: 51°30′36″N 17°10′06″E
- Country: Poland
- Voivodeship: Lower Silesian
- County: Milicz
- Gmina: Milicz

Sulimierz ([suˈlimjɛʂ]) (German: Neudorf-Sulau) is a village in the administrative district of Gmina Milicz, within Milicz County, Lower Silesian Voivodeship, in south-western Poland.

== Notable people ==
- Walther Hahm (1894–1951), German general
