= Ruda Milicka =

- Village
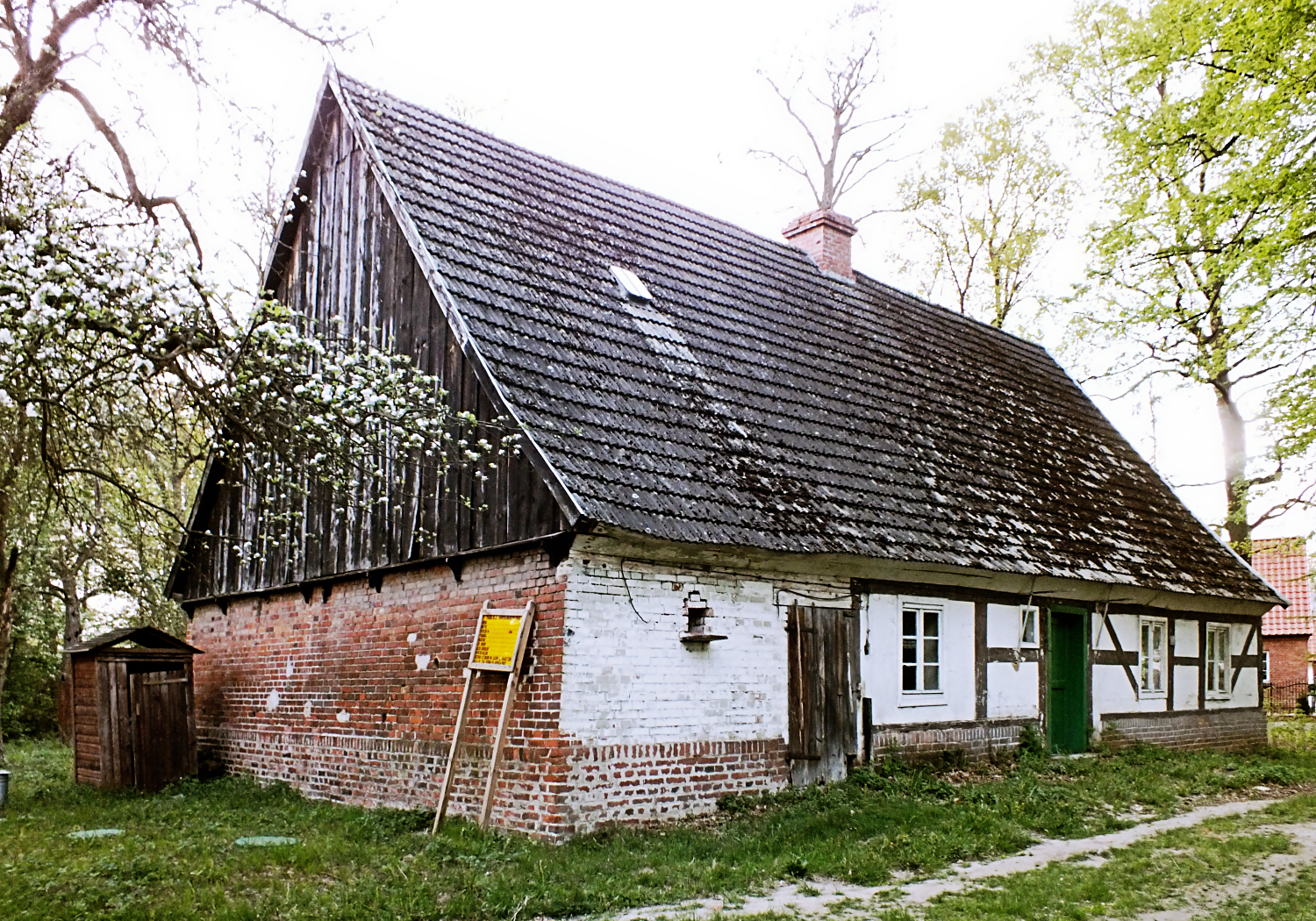
- Ruda Milicka, the forester's lodge of the State Forests, the former forester's lodge of the Milicz branch of the Maltzan family; 19th century; half-timbered wall, partly a timber frame

- Location within Poland
- Coordinates: 51°31′50″N 17°20′17″E
- Country: Poland
- Voivodeship: Lower Silesian
- County: Milicz
- Gmina: Milicz
- Population: 146 (2,011)

Ruda Milicka [ˈruda miˈlit͡ska] is a village in the administrative district of Gmina Milicz, within Milicz County, Lower Silesian Voivodeship, in south-western Poland.
