= Gruszeczka =

- Village
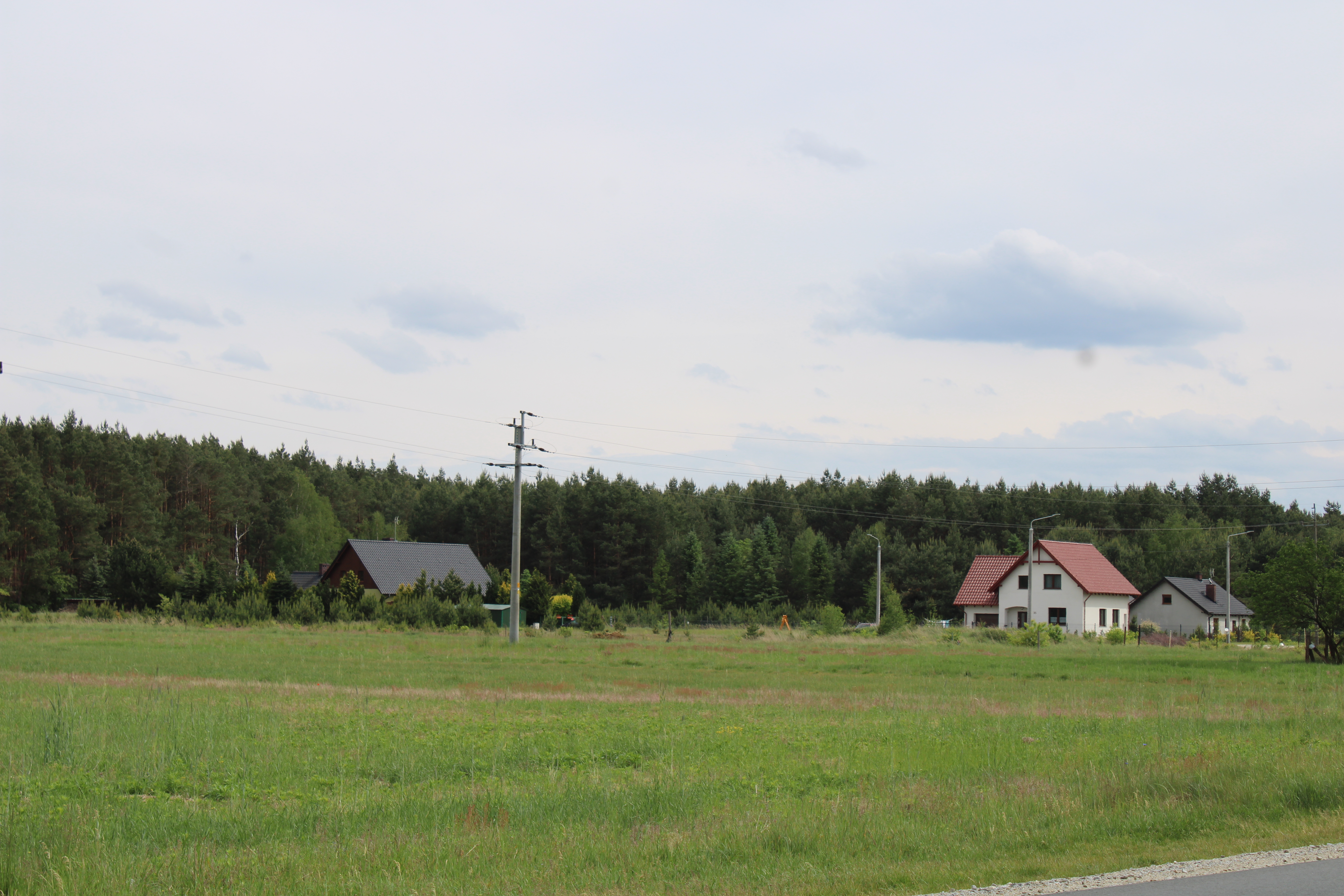

- Location within Poland
- Coordinates: 51°28′22″N 17°09′48″E
- Country: Poland
- Voivodeship: Lower Silesian
- County: Milicz
- Gmina: Milicz
- Time zone: UTC+1 (CET)
  - Summer (DST): UTC+2 (CEST)

Gruszeczka ([ɡruˈʂɛt͡ʂka]) (German: Birnbäumel) is a village in the administrative district of Gmina Milicz, within Milicz County, Lower Silesian Voivodeship, in south-western Poland.

== World War II ==
Gruszeczka was the location of Birnbäumel Concentration Camp with around 1,000 women prisoners working for Nazi German company Unternehmen Barthold. Birnbäumel was a subcamp of Gross-Rosen concentration camp complex, with the majority of inmates, both Christian and Jewish, deported from across occupied Poland.
