= Wróbliniec =

- Village
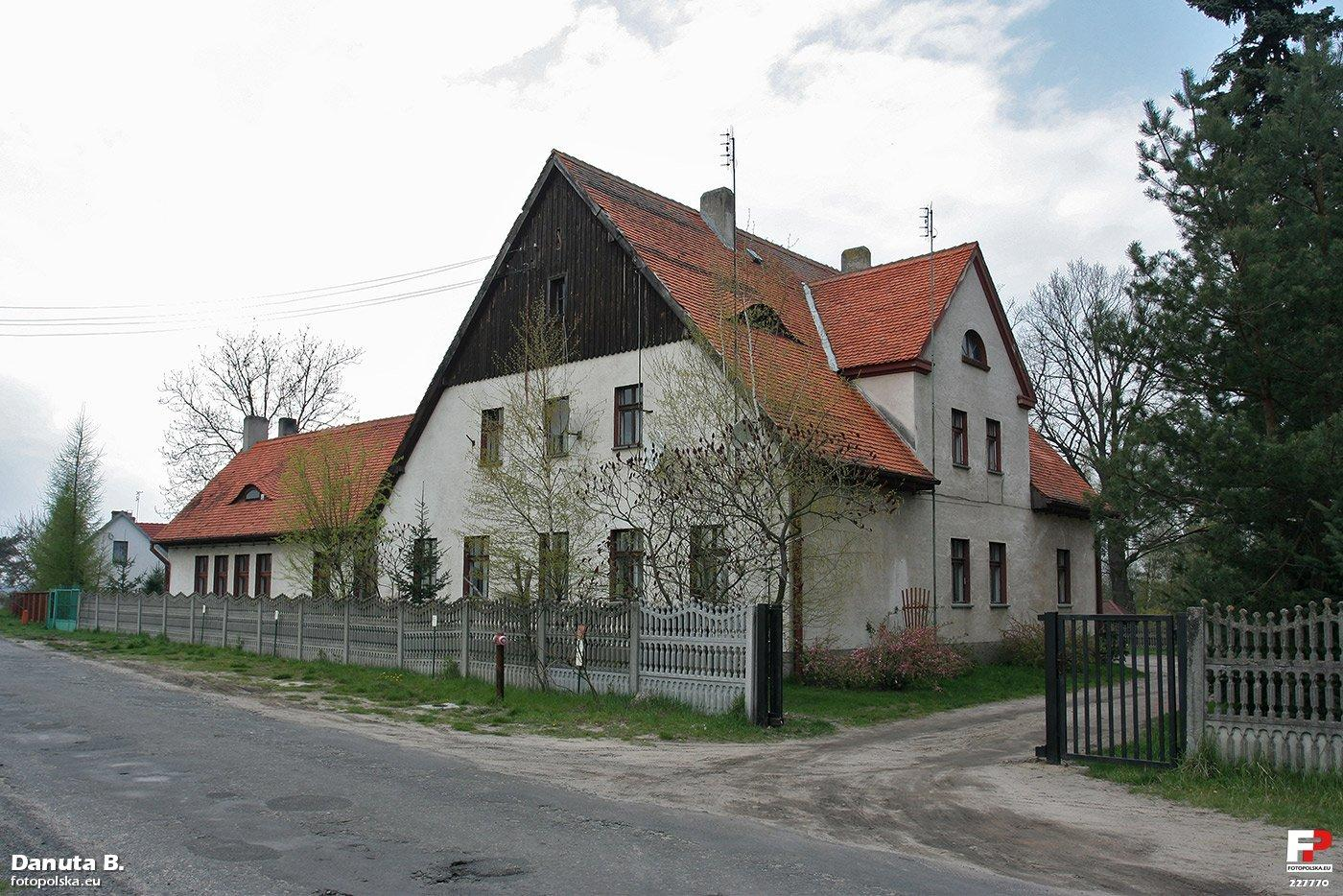

- Location within Poland
- Coordinates: 51°32′31″N 17°32′56″E
- Country: Poland
- Voivodeship: Lower Silesian
- County: Milicz
- Gmina: Milicz

Wróbliniec [vruˈbliɲɛt͡s] is a village in the administrative district of Gmina Milicz, within Milicz County, Lower Silesian Voivodeship, in south-western Poland.
