= Łąki, Lower Silesian Voivodeship =

Łąki
- Village
- Location within Poland
- Coordinates: 51°29′43″N 17°08′06″E
- Country: Poland
- Voivodeship: Lower Silesian
- County: Milicz
- Gmina: Milicz

Łąki (Polish pronunciation: [ˈwɔŋkʲi]) is a village in the administrative district of Gmina Milicz, within Milicz County, Lower Silesian Voivodeship, in south-western Poland.
