= Niesułowice, Lower Silesian Voivodeship =

Niesułowice
- Village
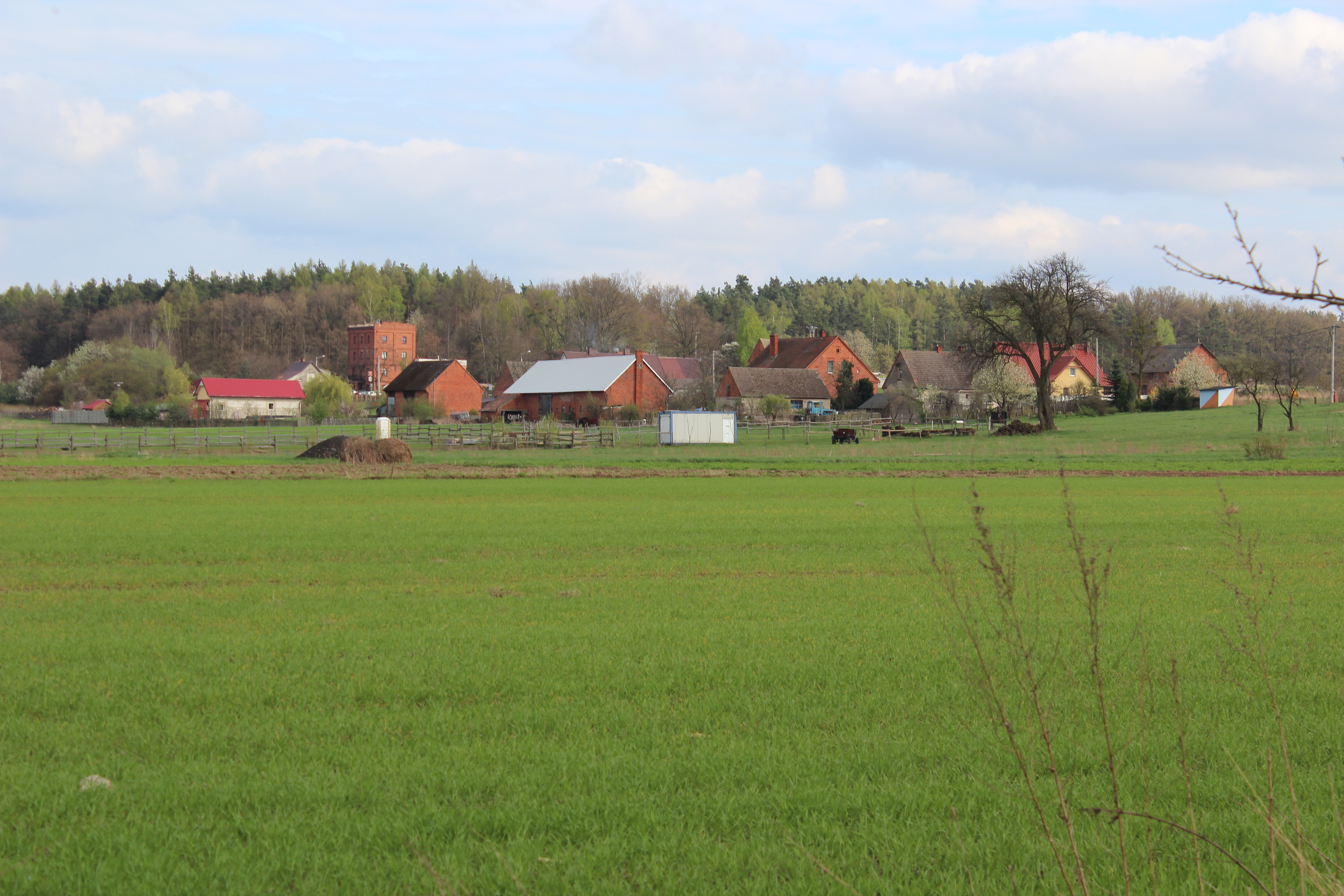

- Location within Poland
- Coordinates: 51°30′57″N 17°20′33″E
- Country: Poland
- Voivodeship: Lower Silesian
- County: Milicz
- Gmina: Milicz

Niesułowice [ɲɛsuwɔˈvit͡sɛ] is a village in the administrative district of Gmina Milicz, within Milicz County, Lower Silesian Voivodeship, in south-western Poland.
