= Heydebrand und der Lasa =

Heydebrand und der Lasa is a German surname. Notable people with the surname include:

- Ernst von Heydebrand und der Lasa (1851–1924), German politician
- Heinrich von Heydebrand und der Lasa (general) (1790–1868), German general
- Heinrich von Heydebrand und der Lasa (politician) (1861–1924) a German politician
- Oskar von Heydebrand und der Lasa (1815–1888), German politician and landowner
- Tassilo von Heydebrand und der Lasa (1818–1899), German chessplayer
