= Latkowa =

- Village
- Location within Poland
- Coordinates: 51°35′42″N 17°29′22″E
- Country: Poland
- Voivodeship: Lower Silesian
- County: Milicz
- Gmina: Milicz

Latkowa [latˈkɔva] is a village in the administrative district of Gmina Milicz, within Milicz County, Lower Silesian Voivodeship, in south-western Poland.
