= Młodzianów, Lower Silesian Voivodeship =

Młodzianów
- Village
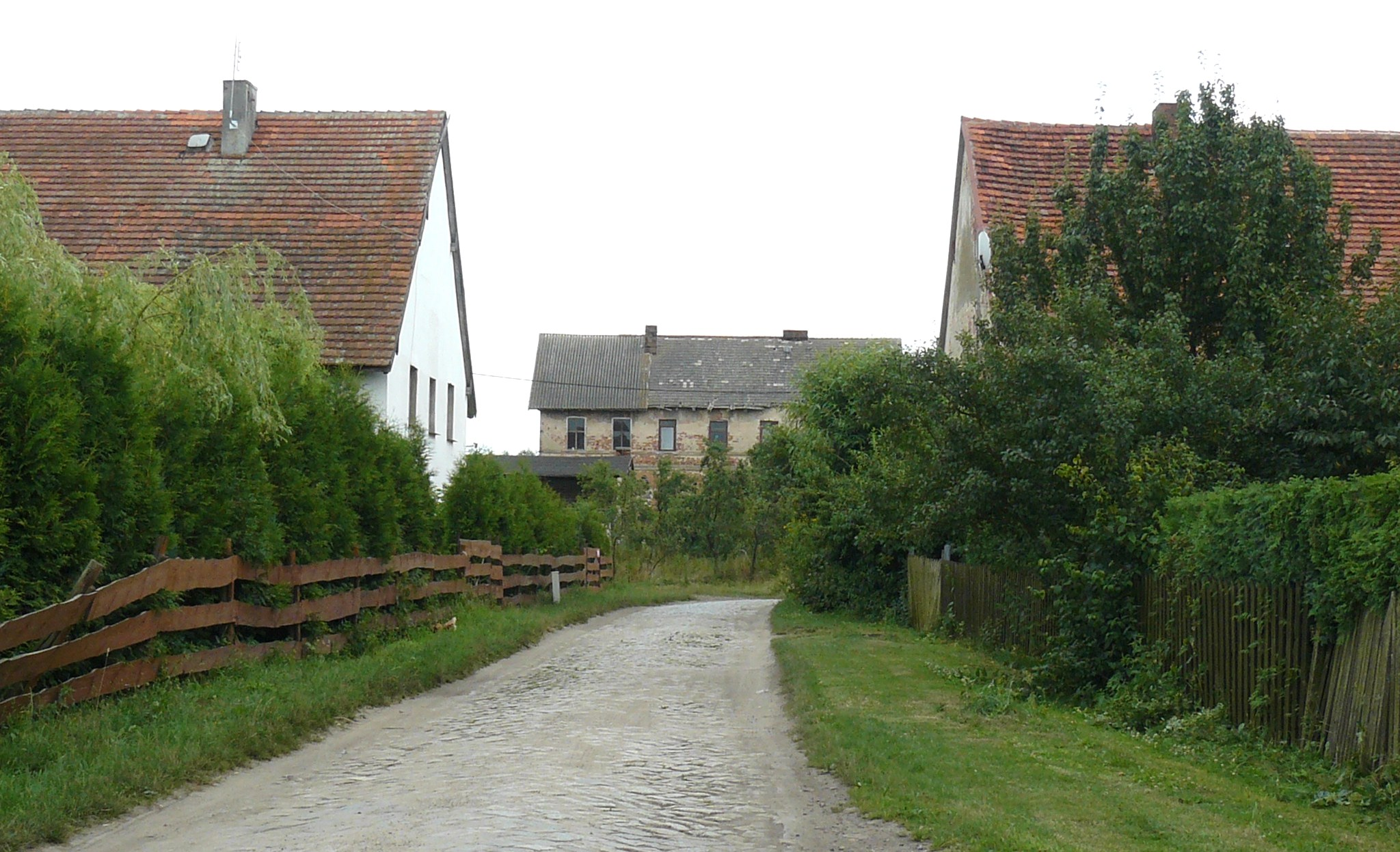

- Location within Poland
- Coordinates: 51°31′16″N 17°25′22″E
- Country: Poland
- Voivodeship: Lower Silesian
- County: Milicz
- Gmina: Milicz

Młodzianów [mwɔˈd͡ʑanuf] is a village in the administrative district of Gmina Milicz, in Milicz County, Lower Silesian Voivodeship in southwestern Poland.
