= Tworzymirki, Lower Silesian Voivodeship =

Tworzymirki
- Village
- Location within Poland
- Coordinates: 51°35′11″N 17°24′12″E
- Country: Poland
- Voivodeship: Lower Silesian
- County: Milicz
- Gmina: Milicz

Tworzymirki [tfɔʐɨˈmirki] is a village in the administrative district of Gmina Milicz, within Milicz County, Lower Silesian Voivodeship, in south-western Poland.
