= Ostrowąsy =

Ostrowąsy may refer to the following places in Poland:

- Ostrowąsy, Lower Silesian Voivodeship (south-west Poland)
- Ostrowąsy, West Pomeranian Voivodeship (north-west Poland)
