= Hans Roericht =

German designer (1932–2025)

- Roericht in 1960
- Born: 15 November 1932; Schönkirch, Prussia, Germany
- Died: 8 December 2025 (aged 93); Ulm, Baden-Württemberg, Germany
- Education: Ulm School of Design
- Occupations: Designer; Academic teacher
- Organizations: Produktentwicklung Roericht; Hochschule der Künste Berlin

Hans Albrecht "Nick" Roericht (15 November 1932 – 8 December 2025) was a German designer. He designed the TC100 stacking tableware for his thesis at the Ulm School of Design in 1959, which became iconic. He was an influential teacher as professor at the Hochschule der Künste Berlin from 1973 to 2002, heading a faculty for industrial design.

== Life and career ==
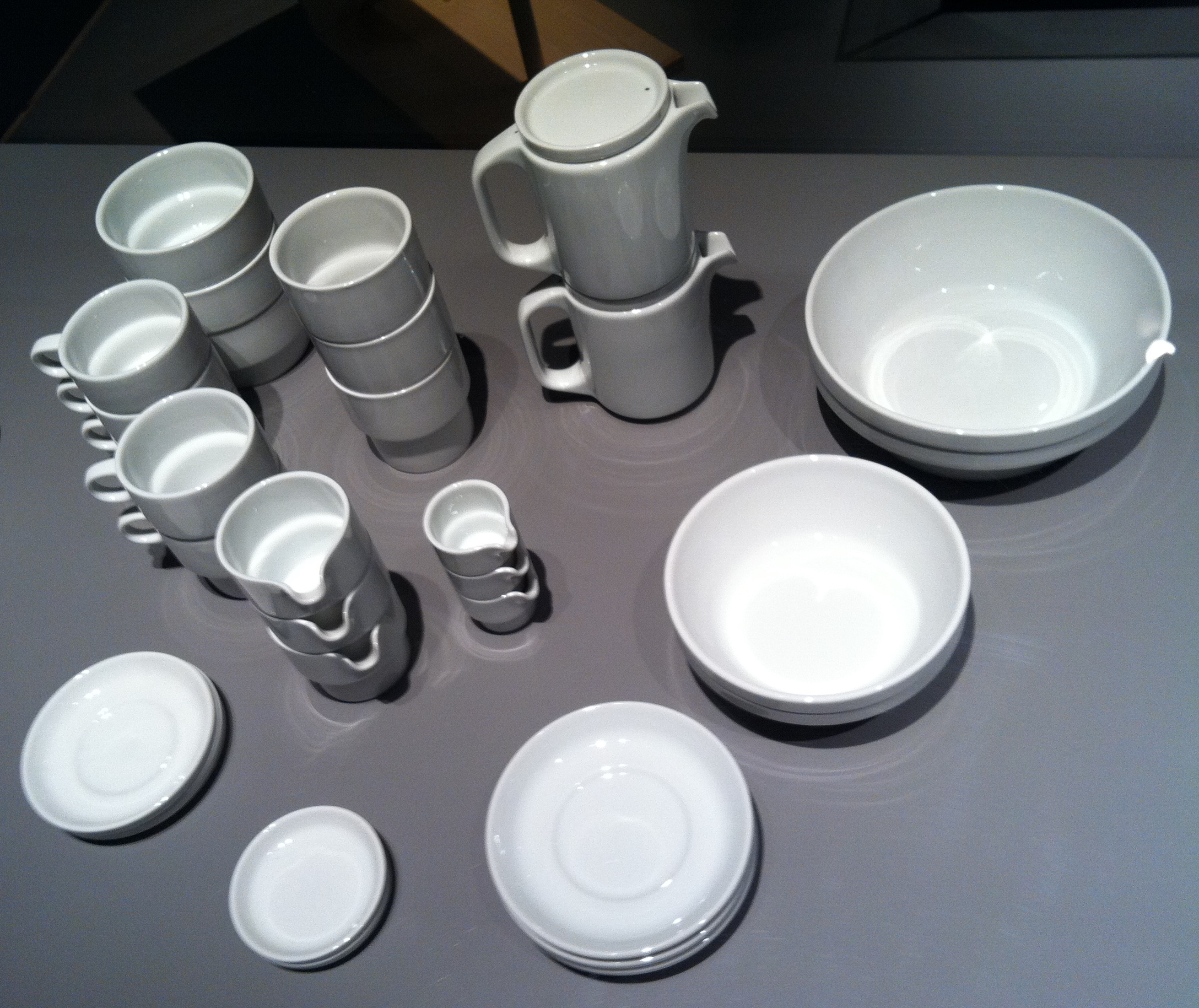
TC100 stacking tableware

Roericht was born in Schönkirch (now Gądkowice, Poland) on 15 November 1932. He studied at the Ulm School of Design from 1955, when the institution was opened, to 1959. He later said what he learned from his teachers Tomás Maldonado, Werner Blaser, Konrad Wachsmann, Hans Gugelot, and Georg Leowald. He designed a set of stacking tableware for his 1959 dissertation there. He missed well-designed tableware in the school, and focused on robustness, stackability and dishwasher suitability. A trade magazine presented the design on its cover and devoted a detailed article to it. Produced from 1961, it was later exhibited at the Museum of Modern Art in New York City.

Roericht worked at the Ulm School of Design collaborating first with Leowald in 1960, then with Otl Aicher. There, he designed Lufthansa's in-flight tableware with Otl. From 1961, he joined Otl in Munich in the team to design visual identity for the 1972 Summer Olympics in Munich. With the team, he designed key elements such as the plastic shell seats in the Olympic Stadium that became part of the Games identity. He founded his own office in 1967, named Produktentwicklung Roericht, working on designs for Bosch, Loewe, Rodenstock, Siemens and Wilkhahn. He offered interdisciplinary investigations of possible spaces, visualising the cultural environment prior to solutions. He designed for Wilkhahn the standing seat "Stitz" and "Picto", the first recyclable office chair.

From 1966 to 1967, Roericht taught as a professor at the Ohio State University. Roericht taught as a professor at the Hochschule der Künste Berlin from 1973 to his retirement in 2002, integrating theory, aesthetics, craftsmanship and, reflecting social responsibility, the "human context". Twenty of his students became professors of design.

Roericht died in Ulm on 8 December 2025, at the age of 93. He is remembered for his view on design as a "holistic problem-solving instrument", not decoration alone but serving people in everyday life and ecological realities. An archive of his library and works is held by the Ulm School of Design.
