= Postolin =

Postolin may refer to the following places in Poland:

- Postolin, Lower Silesian Voivodeship (south-west Poland)
- Postolin, Pomeranian Voivodeship (north Poland)
