= Miłosławice, Lower Silesian Voivodeship =

Miłosławice
- Village
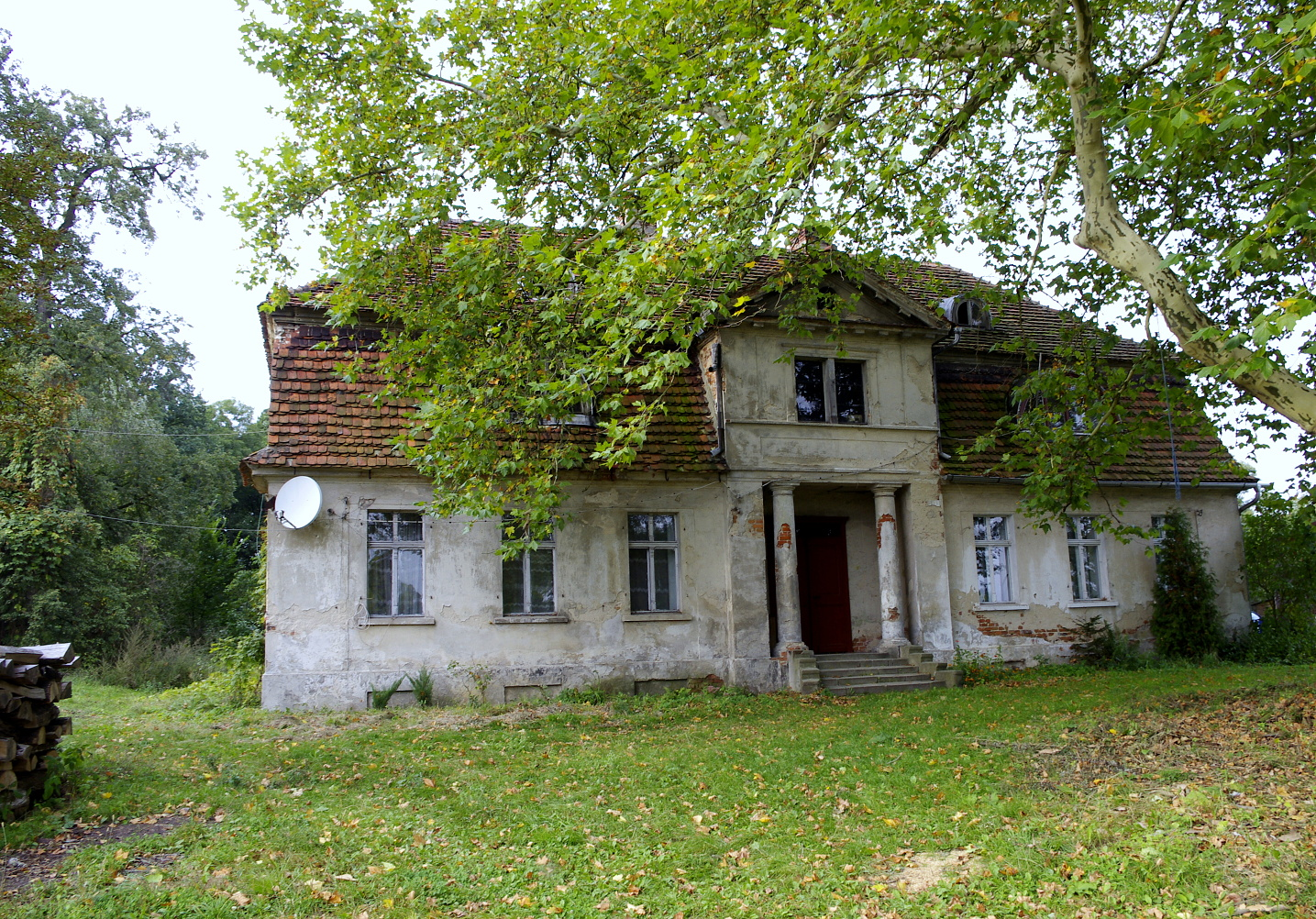
- Manor

- Location within Poland
- Coordinates: 51°30′18″N 17°11′37″E
- Country: Poland
- Voivodeship: Lower Silesian
- County: Milicz
- Gmina: Milicz

Miłosławice [miwɔswaˈvit͡sɛ] is a village in the administrative district of Gmina Milicz, within Milicz County, Lower Silesian Voivodeship, in south-western Poland.

== Transport ==
Miłosławice is inaccessible by rail. It is accessible by the 439 road, which runs through the village.
