= Bartniki =

Bartniki may refer to the following places in Poland:

- Bartniki, Milicz County in Lower Silesian Voivodeship (south-west Poland)
- Bartniki, Podlaskie Voivodeship (north-east Poland)
- Bartniki, Przasnysz County in Masovian Voivodeship (east-central Poland)
- Bartniki, Żyrardów County in Masovian Voivodeship (east-central Poland)
- Bartniki, Warmian-Masurian Voivodeship (north Poland)
