= Sławoszowice =

- Village
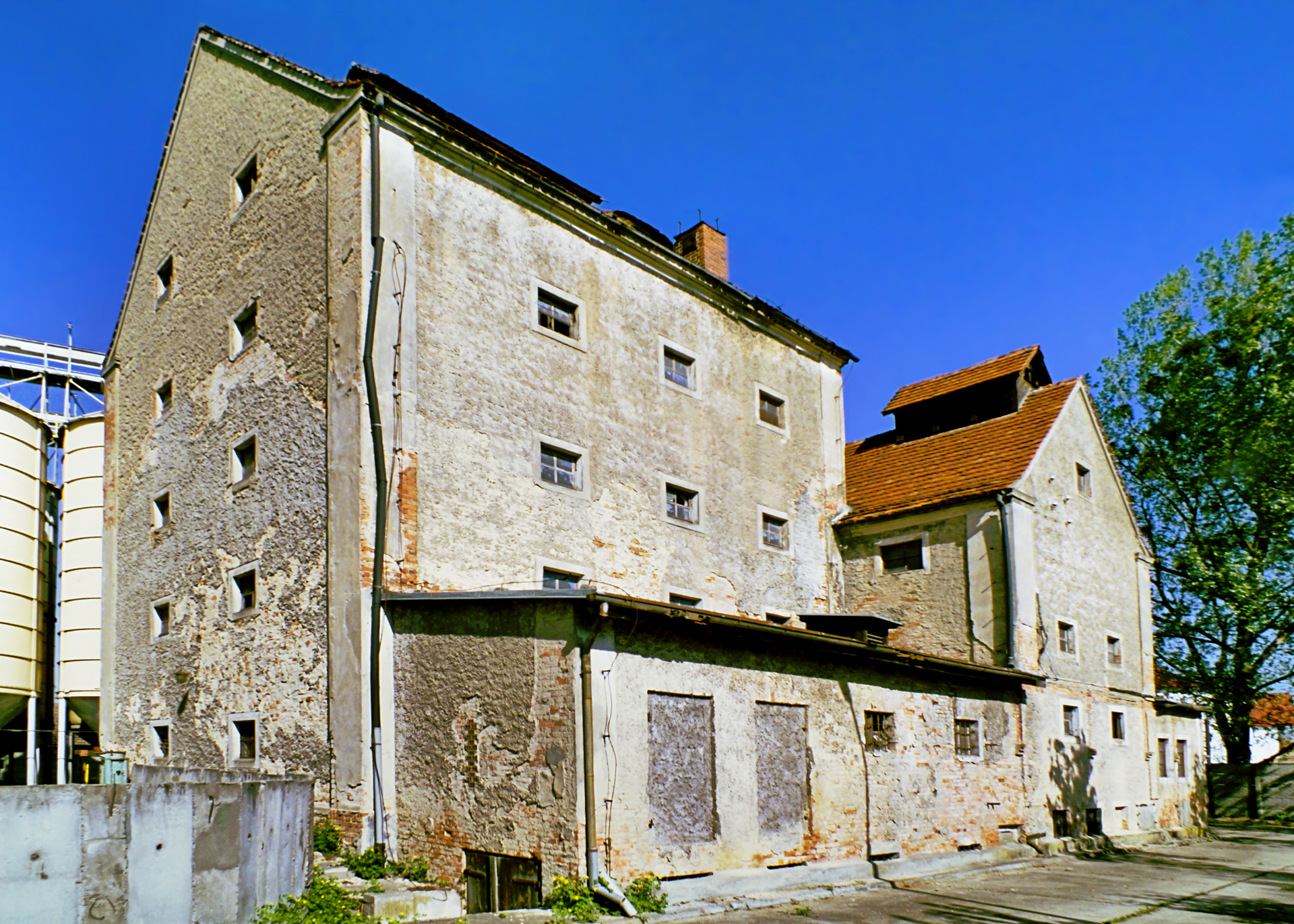

- Location within Poland
- Coordinates: 51°31′59″N 17°18′02″E
- Country: Poland
- Voivodeship: Lower Silesian
- County: Milicz
- Gmina: Milicz

Sławoszowice [swavɔʂɔˈvit͡sɛ] is a village in the administrative district of Gmina Milicz, within Milicz County, Lower Silesian Voivodeship, in south-western Poland.
