= Pracze =

- Village
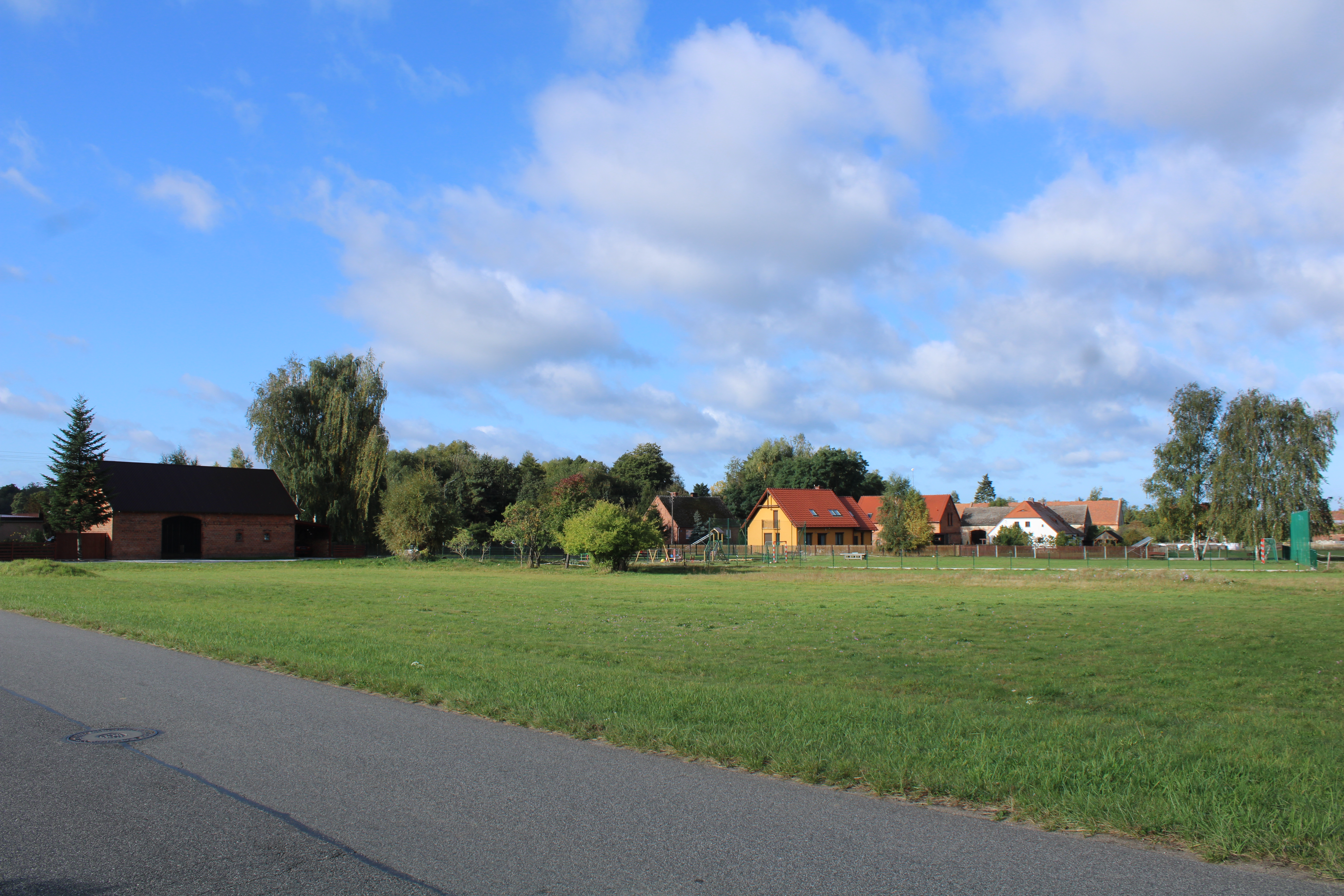

- Location within Poland
- Coordinates: 51°29′N 17°13′E
- Country: Poland
- Voivodeship: Lower Silesian
- County: Milicz
- Gmina: Milicz

Pracze [ˈprat͡ʂɛ] (German: Protsch) is a village in the administrative district of Gmina Milicz, within Milicz County, Lower Silesian Voivodeship, in south-western Poland.
