= Tworzymirki Górne =

- Village
- Location within Poland
- Coordinates: 51°32′11″N 17°25′11″E
- Country: Poland
- Voivodeship: Lower Silesian
- County: Milicz
- Gmina: Milicz

Tworzymirki Górne [tfɔʐɨˈmirki ˈɡurnɛ] is a village in the administrative district of Gmina Milicz, within Milicz County, Lower Silesian Voivodeship, in south-western Poland.
