= Potasznia =

Potasznia may refer to the following places in Poland:

- Potasznia, Lower Silesian Voivodeship (south-west Poland)
- Potasznia, Lublin Voivodeship (east Poland)
- Potasznia, Podlaskie Voivodeship (north-east Poland)
