= Piotrkosice =

- Village
- Location within Poland
- Coordinates: 51°33′08″N 17°10′10″E
- Country: Poland
- Voivodeship: Lower Silesian
- County: Milicz
- Gmina: Milicz

Piotrkosice [pjɔtrkɔˈɕit͡sɛ] is a village in the administrative district of Gmina Milicz, within Milicz County, Lower Silesian Voivodeship, in south-western Poland.
