= Stawiec, Lower Silesian Voivodeship =

Stawiec
- Village
- Location within Poland
- Coordinates: 51°33′22″N 17°15′51″E
- Country: Poland
- Voivodeship: Lower Silesian
- County: Milicz
- Gmina: Milicz

Stawiec [ˈstavjɛt͡s] is a village in the administrative district of Gmina Milicz, within Milicz County, Lower Silesian Voivodeship, in south-western Poland.
