= Dunkowa =

- Village
- Location within Poland
- Coordinates: 51°32′N 17°10′E
- Country: Poland
- Voivodeship: Lower Silesian
- County: Milicz
- Gmina: Milicz

Dunkowa [dunˈkɔva] is a village in the administrative district of Gmina Milicz, within Milicz County, Lower Silesian Voivodeship, in south-western Poland.
