= Świętoszyn =

- Village
- Location within Poland
- Coordinates: 51°31′34″N 17°13′48″E
- Country: Poland
- Voivodeship: Lower Silesian
- County: Milicz
- Gmina: Milicz

Świętoszyn (Polish: [ɕfjɛnˈtɔʂɨn]) (German: Schwentroschine, Waldheide (1939–1945)) is a village in the administrative district of Gmina Milicz, within Milicz County, Lower Silesian Voivodeship, in south-western Poland.
