= Henrykowice =

- Village
- Location within Poland
- Coordinates: 51°31′07″N 17°26′54″E
- Country: Poland
- Voivodeship: Lower Silesian
- County: Milicz
- Gmina: Milicz

Henrykowice [xɛnrɨkɔˈvit͡sɛ] is a village in the administrative district of Gmina Milicz, within Milicz County, Lower Silesian Voivodeship, in south-western Poland.

The settlement's German name indicates that the village was founded in the Middle Ages by German settlers.
