= Picto chair =

Swivel chair designed by Hans Roericht

The Picto chair is a mass-produced swivel chair, manufactured by Wilkhahn since 1993, and designed by Hans Roericht.

The chair is 95% recyclable, with fully dismountable components made from polypropylene, aluminium, polyurethane foam, beech wood, and pigments.

One such example of the chair is kept in the Furniture and Woodwork Collection at the Victoria and Albert Museum, London.
