= Wziąchowo Wielkie =

- Village
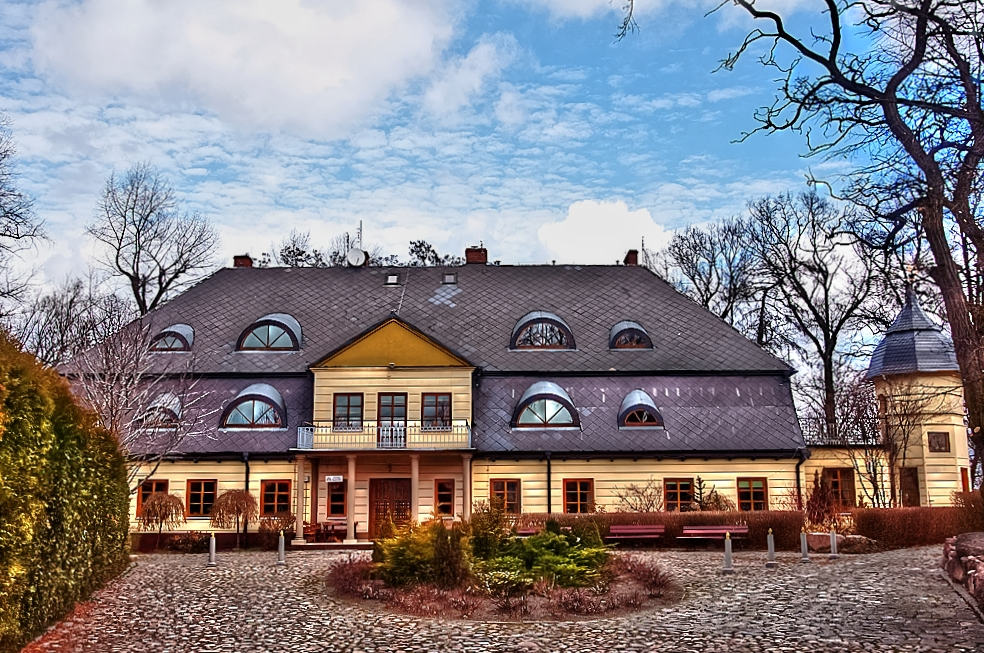
- Manor

- Location within Poland
- Coordinates: 51°34′55″N 17°27′23″E
- Country: Poland
- Voivodeship: Lower Silesian
- County: Milicz
- Gmina: Milicz

Wziąchowo Wielkie [vʑɔ̃ˈxɔvɔ ˈvjɛlkʲɛ] is a village in the administrative district of Gmina Milicz, within Milicz County, Lower Silesian Voivodeship, in south-western Poland.
