= Miłochowice =

- Village
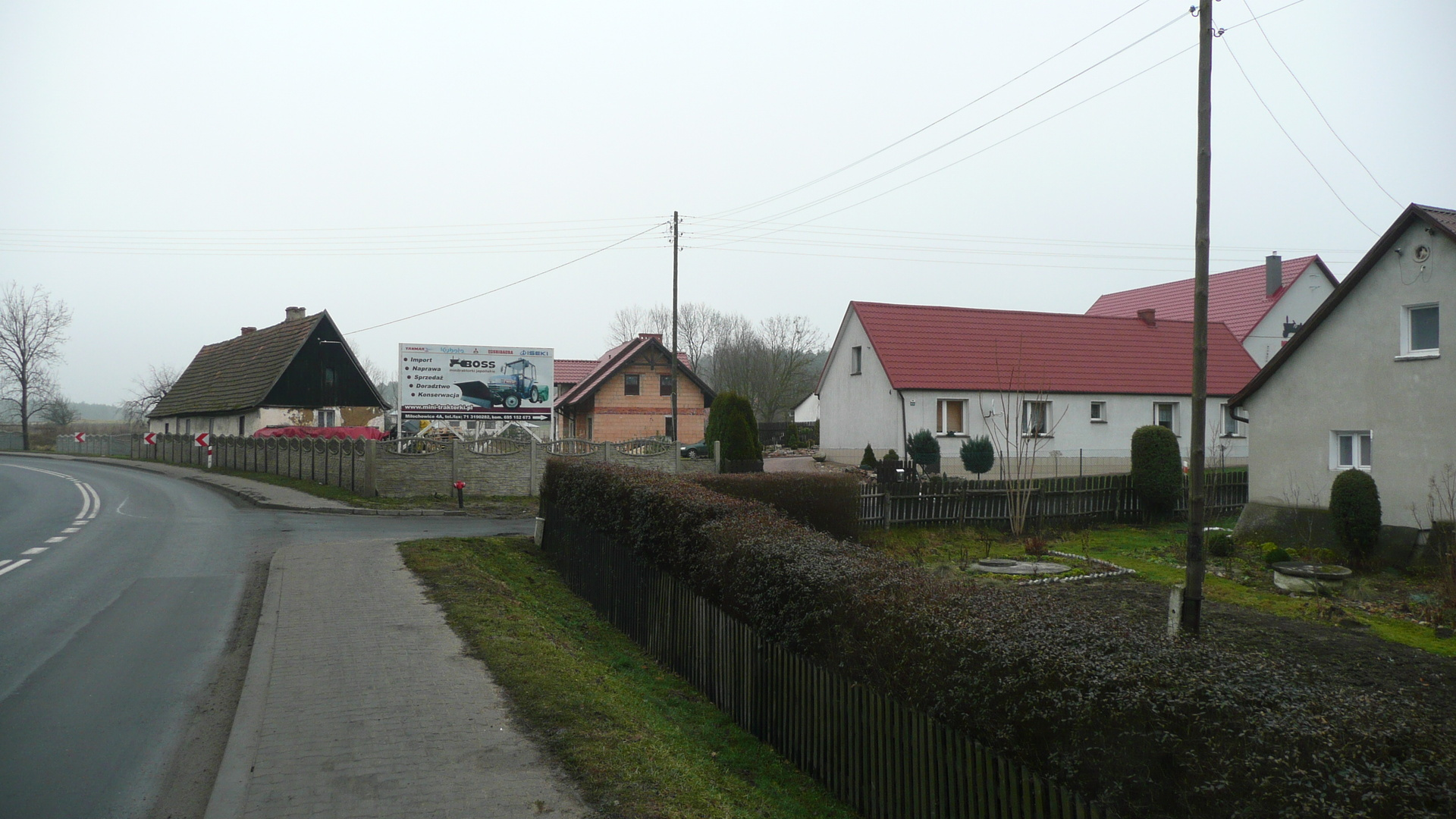

- Location within Poland
- Coordinates: 51°30′N 17°17′E
- Country: Poland
- Voivodeship: Lower Silesian
- County: Milicz
- Gmina: Milicz

Miłochowice [miwɔxɔˈvit͡sɛ] (German: Melochwitz) is a village in the administrative district of Gmina Milicz, within Milicz County, Lower Silesian Voivodeship, in south-western Poland.
