= Godnowa =

- Village
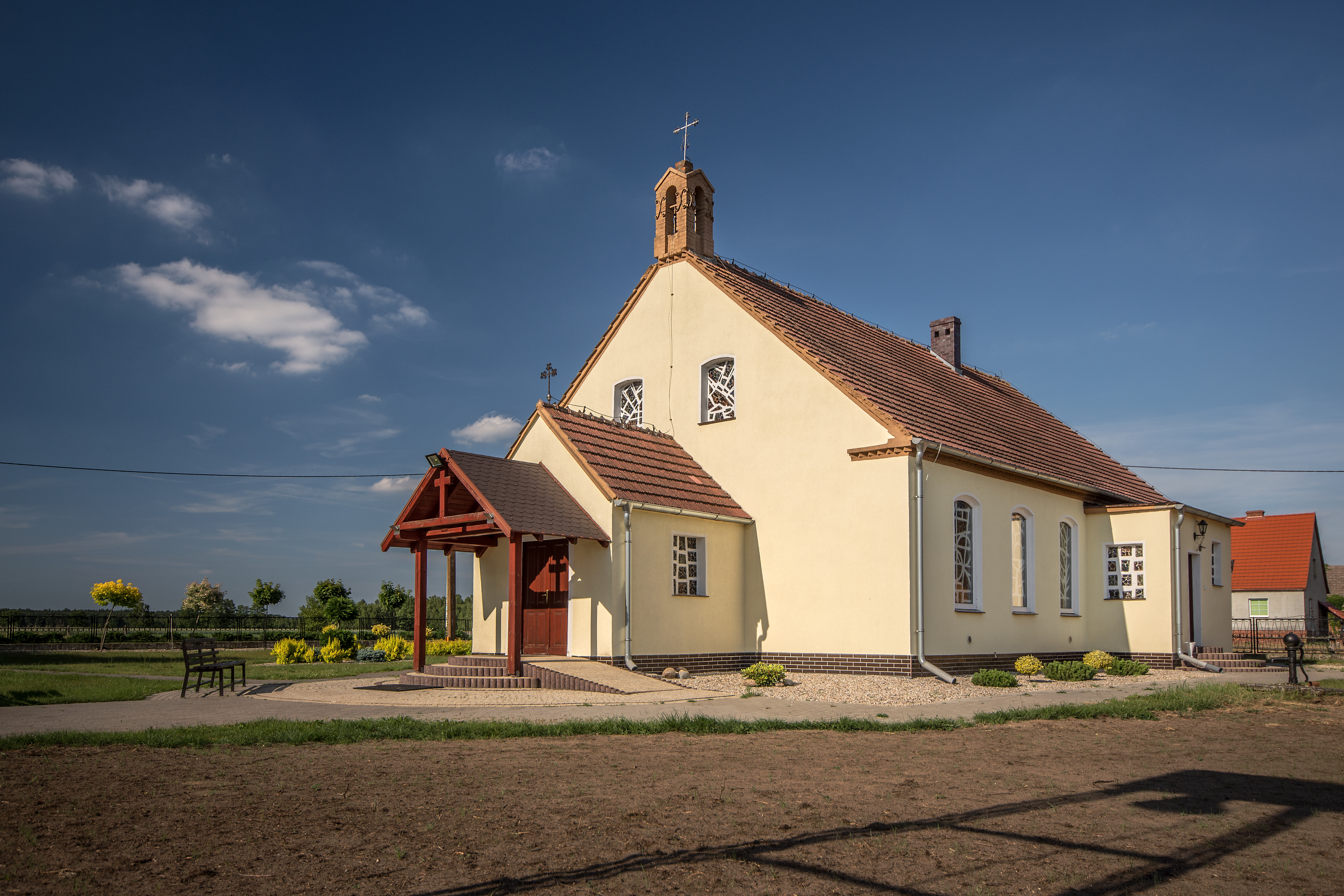
- Catholic church

- Location within Poland
- Coordinates: 51°33′49″N 17°19′58″E
- Country: Poland
- Voivodeship: Lower Silesian
- County: Milicz
- Gmina: Milicz

Godnowa [ɡɔdˈnɔva] is a village in the administrative district of Gmina Milicz, within Milicz County, Lower Silesian Voivodeship, in south-western Poland.
