= Gmina Milicz =

Gmina Milicz Milicz Commune
- Gmina
- Flag Coat of arms
- Interactive map of Gmina Milicz
- Coordinates (Milicz): 51°32′N 17°17′E
- Country: Poland
- Voivodeship: Lower Silesian
- County: Milicz
- Seat: Milicz
- Sołectwos: List: Baranowice; Bartniki; Borzynowo; Brzezina Sułowska; Czatkowice; Duchowo; Dunkowa; Gądkowice; Godnowa; Gogołowice; Gołkowo; Grabówka; Grabownica; Gruszeczka; Henrykowice; Kaszowo; Kolęda; Łąki; Latkowa; Miłochowice; Miłosławice; Młodzianów; Niesułowice; Nowy Zamek; Olsza; Ostrowąsy; Piękocin; Piotrkosice; Poradów; Postolin; Potasznia; Pracze; Ruda Milicka; Ruda Sułowska; Słączno; Sławoszowice; Stawiec; Sulimierz; Sułów; Świętoszyn; Tworzymirki; Tworzymirki Górne; Wałkowa; Węgrzynów; Wielgie Milickie; Wilkowo; Wodników Górny; Wróbliniec; Wrocławice; Wszewilki, Wziąchowo Małe, Wziąchowo Wielkie

Area
  - Total: 435.61 km^{2} (168.19 sq mi)

Population (2019-06-30)
  - Total: 24,172
  - Density: 55.490/km^{2} (143.72/sq mi)
  - Urban: 11,304
  - Rural: 12,868
- Website: http://www.milicz.pl

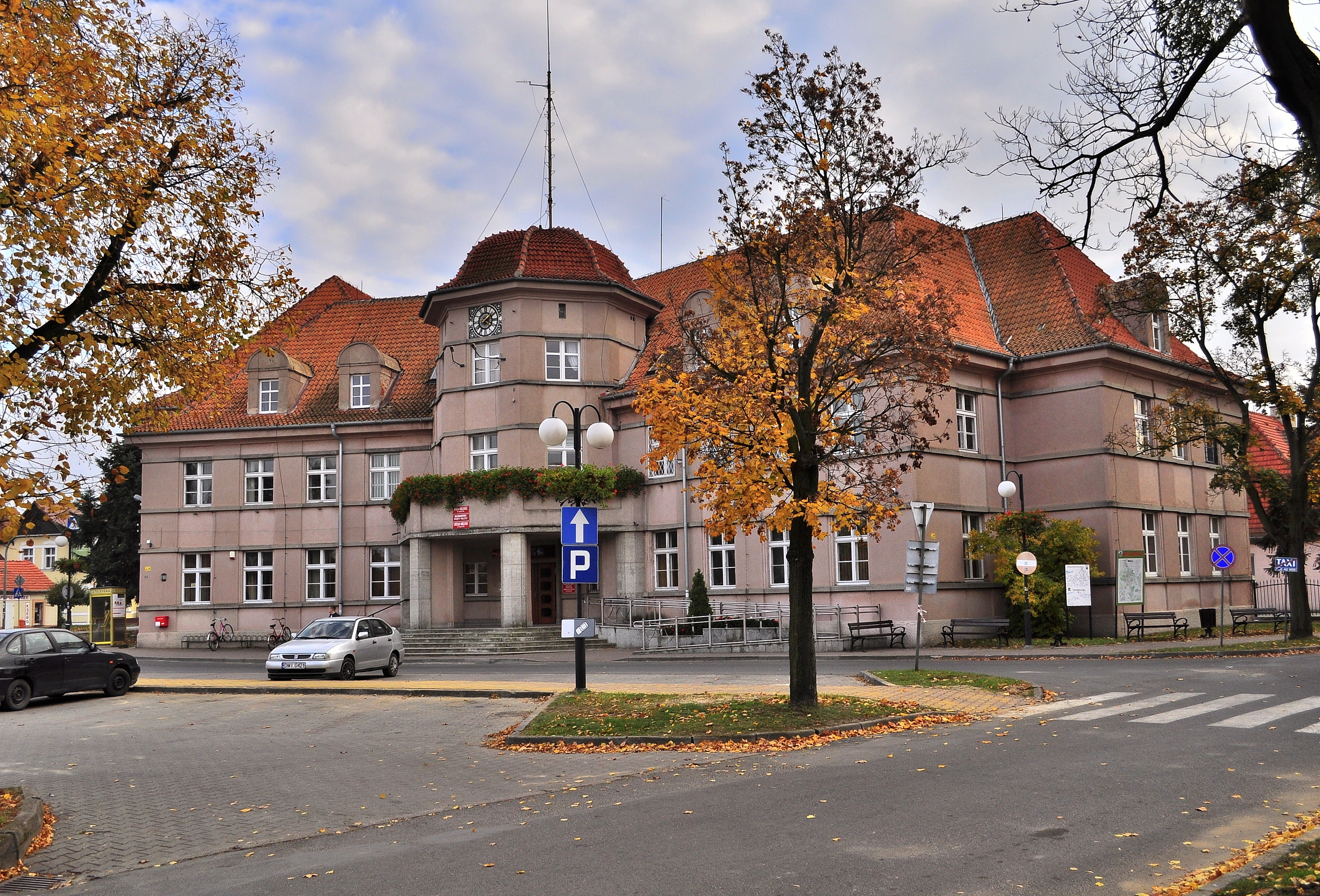
The building of the Municipal Office in Milicz.

Gmina Milicz is an urban-rural gmina (administrative district) in Milicz County, Lower Silesian Voivodeship, in south-western Poland. Its seat is the town of Milicz, which lies approximately 49 kilometres (30 mi) north of the regional capital Wrocław.

The gmina covers an area of 435.61 square kilometres (168.2 sq mi). As of 2019, its total population was 24,172. It is part of the larger Wrocław metropolitan area.

== Neighbouring gminas ==
Gmina Milicz is bordered by the town of Sulmierzyce and the gminas of Cieszków, Jutrosin, Krośnice, Odolanów, Pakosław, Rawicz, Sośnie, Trzebnica, Zawonia, Zduny and Żmigród.

== Villages ==
Apart from the town of Milicz, the gmina contains the villages of:

- Baranowice
- Bartniki
- Borzynowo
- Brzezina Sułowska
- Czatkowice
- Duchowo
- Dunkowa
- Gądkowice
- Godnowa
- Gogołowice
- Gołkowo
- Grabówka
- Grabownica
- Gruszeczka
- Henrykowice
- Kaszowo
- Kolęda
- Łąki
- Latkowa
- Miłochowice
- Miłosławice
- Młodzianów
- Niesułowice
- Nowy Zamek
- Olsza
- Ostrowąsy
- Piękocin
- Piotrkosice
- Poradów
- Postolin
- Potasznia
- Pracze
- Ruda Milicka
- Ruda Sułowska
- Słączno
- Sławoszowice
- Stawiec
- Sulimierz
- Sułów
- Świętoszyn
- Tworzymirki
- Tworzymirki Górne
- Wałkowa
- Węgrzynów
- Wielgie Milickie
- Wilkowo
- Wodników Górny
- Wróbliniec
- Wrocławice
- Wszewilki
- Wziąchowo Małe
- Wziąchowo Wielkie

== Twin towns – sister cities ==
Gmina Milicz is twinned with:

- (Georgia (country)) Kobuleti, Georgia (2017)
- Lohr am Main, Germany (2000)
