= Bartniki, Milicz County =

Bartniki
- Village
- Location within Poland
- Coordinates: 51°33′42″N 17°33′03″E
- Country: Poland
- Voivodeship: Lower Silesian
- County: Milicz
- Gmina: Milicz
- Population: 310

Bartniki [bartˈniki] is a village in the administrative district of Gmina Milicz, within Milicz County, Lower Silesian Voivodeship, in south-western Poland.
