= Nowy Zamek =

- Village
- Location within Poland
- Coordinates: 51°33′57″N 17°21′30″E
- Country: Poland
- Voivodeship: Lower Silesian
- County: Milicz
- Gmina: Milicz

Nowy Zamek [ˈnɔvɨ ˈzamɛk] is a village in the administrative district of Gmina Milicz, within Milicz County, Lower Silesian Voivodeship, in south-western Poland. Its name in both Polish and German means new castle.
