= Ernst von Heydebrand und der Lasa =

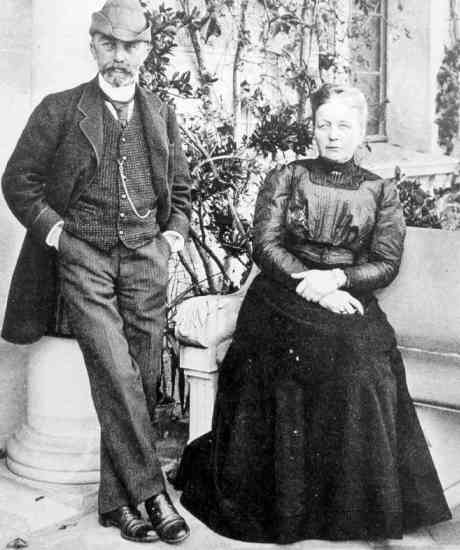
- Born: 20 February 1851; Golkowe/Militsch-Trachenberg
- Died: 20 February 1924 (aged 72); Klein Tschunkawe/Militsch-Trachenberg
- Occupation: Politician

Ernst von Heydebrand und der Lasa (born 20 February 1851 in Golkowe/Militsch-Trachenberg; died 15 November 1924 in Klein Tschunkawe/Militsch-Trachenberg) was a German politician for German Conservative Party.

== Life ==
His father was Silesian landowner and politician Oskar von Heydebrand und der Lasa and his mother was Agathe von Salisch. He studied German law at university in Jena. In 1870/71 he became soldier during Franco-Prussian War. In 1882, he became Landrat in Silesia. In 1888, Heydebrand became member of Prussian House of Representatives for German Conservative Party.

In 1903, Heydebrand became member of German Reichstag for German Conservative Party.

From 1911 to 1918 he was chairman of German Conservative Party. In 1892, he married in Limbsee Marie von Dallwitz (1855–1923).
