= Ostrowąsy, Lower Silesian Voivodeship =

Ostrowąsy
- Village
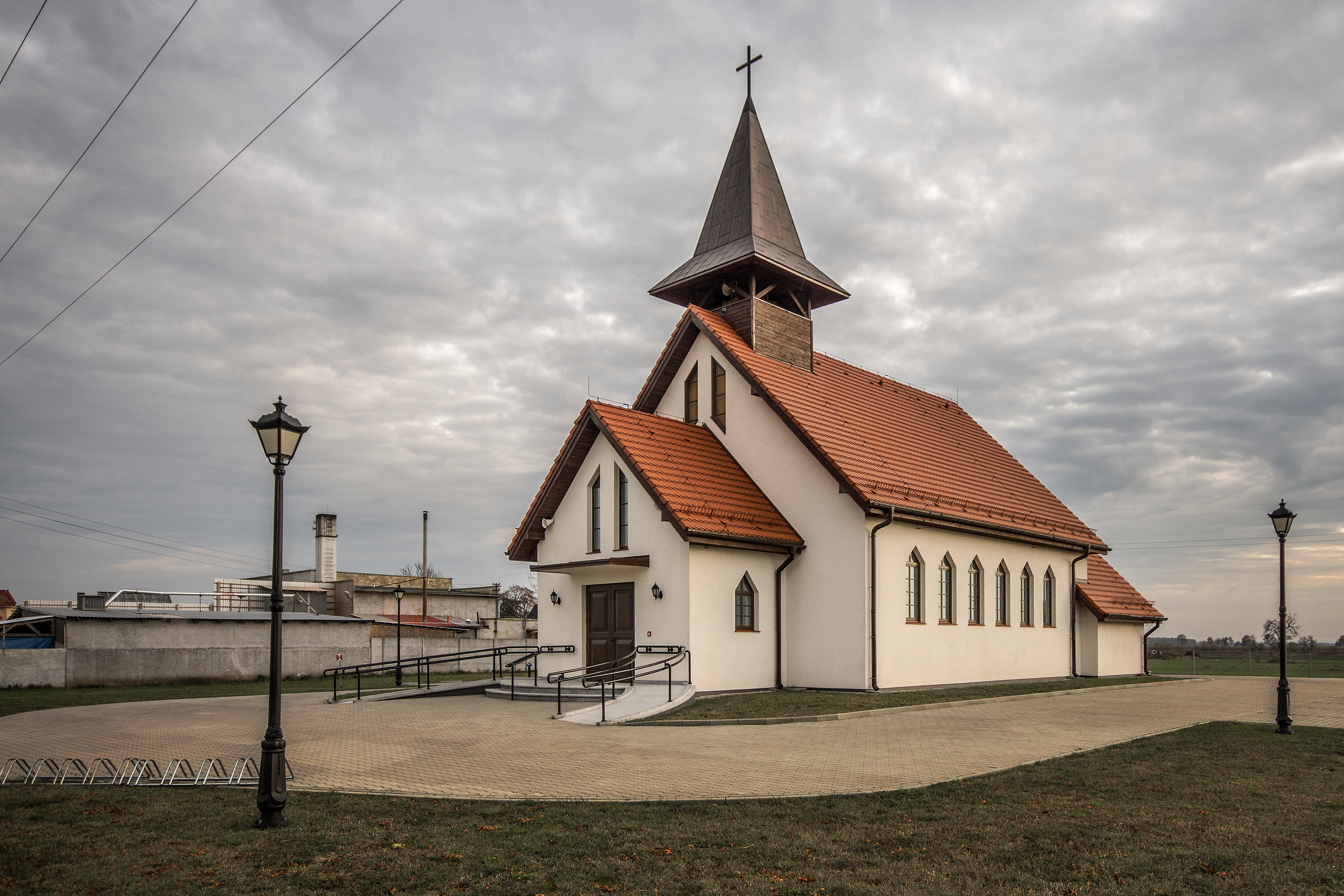
- Catholic church

- Location within Poland
- Coordinates: 51°36′N 17°28′E
- Country: Poland
- Voivodeship: Lower Silesian
- County: Milicz
- Gmina: Milicz

Ostrowąsy [ɔstrɔˈvɔ̃sɨ] is a village in the administrative district of Gmina Milicz, within Milicz County, Lower Silesian Voivodeship, in south-western Poland.
