= Borzynowo, Lower Silesian Voivodeship =

Borzynowo
- Village
- Location within Poland
- Coordinates: 51°30′22″N 17°28′50″E
- Country: Poland
- Voivodeship: Lower Silesian
- County: Milicz
- Gmina: Milicz

Borzynowo [bɔʐɨˈnɔvɔ] is a village in the administrative district of Gmina Milicz, within Milicz County, Lower Silesian Voivodeship, in south-western Poland.
