= Kolyada (surname) =

Kolyada or Koliada (Russian and Ukrainian: Коляда) is a gender-neutral Slavic surname derived from the word koliada. It may refer to:

- Ihor Koliada (born 1964), Ukrainian footballer
- Mikhail Kolyada (born 1995), Russian figure skater
- Nikolay Kolyada (1957–2026), Soviet-Russian writer and playwright
- Oksana Koliada (born 1980), Ukrainian politician
- Sergei Kolyada (1907–1996), Soviet portrait artist
