= Kolęda, Lower Silesian Voivodeship =

Kolęda
- Village
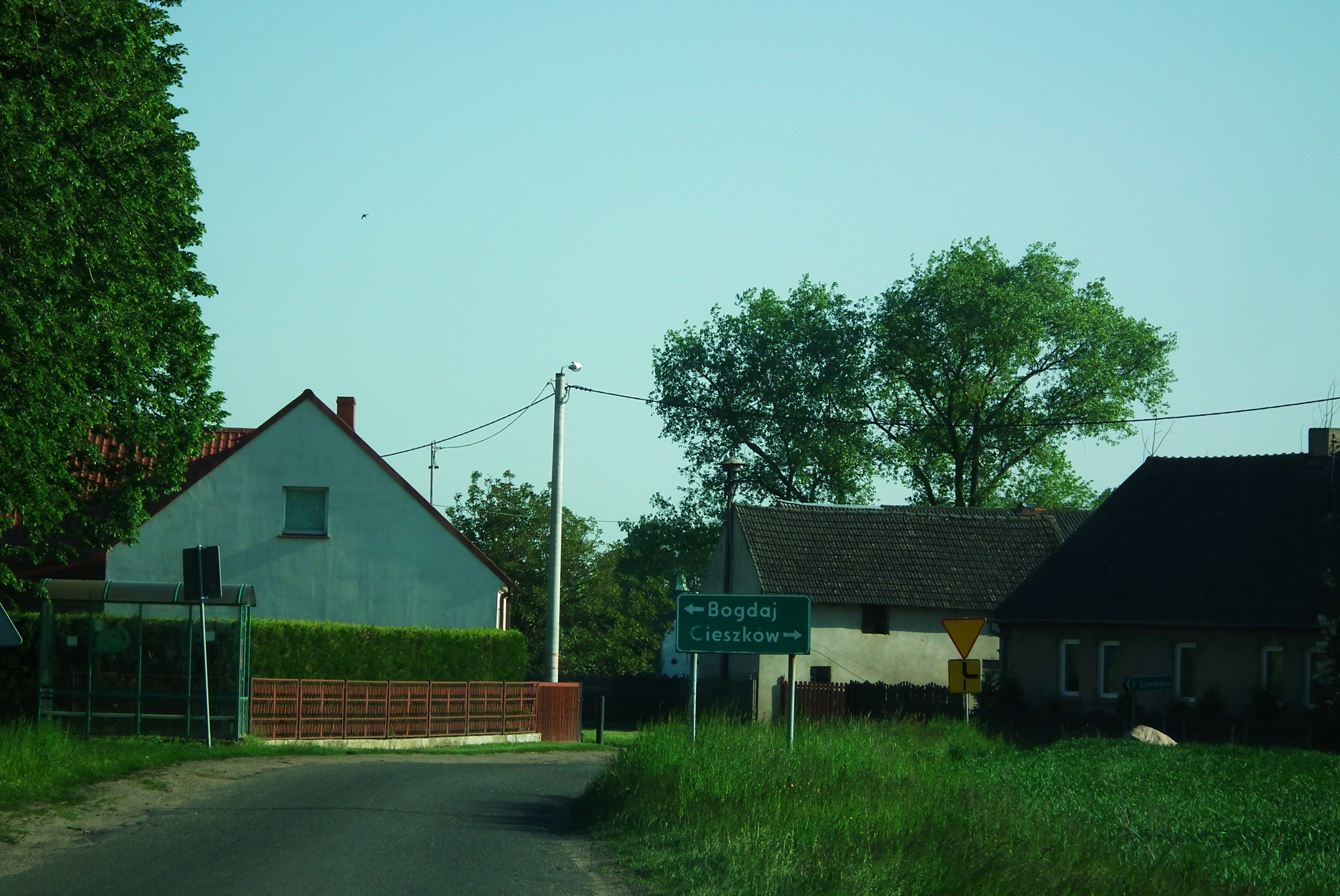

- Location within Poland
- Coordinates: 51°35′02″N 17°31′47″E
- Country: Poland
- Voivodeship: Lower Silesian
- County: Milicz
- Gmina: Milicz

Kolęda [kɔˈlɛnda] is a village in the administrative district of Gmina Milicz, within Milicz County, Lower Silesian Voivodeship, in south-western Poland.
