= Fritz Hahne =

Fritz Hahne (15 April 1920 – 28 June 2008) was a German entrepreneur.

== Life ==
In 1907 Friedrich Hahne and Christian Wilkening founded a chair-making factory named Wilkhahn in Eimbeckhausen near Hannover. In the 1940s their sons Fritz Hahne and Adolf Wilkening took over their fathers' chair factory.

Fritz Hahne managed the company from 1946 to 1982 and reformed the German entrepreneurship. He looked for new ways of enabling employees to share actively in the company's success. He established the maxim "No orders without explanations". The goal: a relationship based on partnership and responsibility.

In the 1960s he worked in close collaboration with the Ulmer Hochschule für Gestaltung (Ulm Academy of Design). They set standards in product design.

At a staff meeting in December 1970 Fritz Hahne announced a 50% profit-sharing scheme for employees to come into effect in January 1971.

After he was not longer involved in the day-to-day business he was president of the Wilkhahn Board of Administration and board member of the International Design Center in Berlin from 1982 to 1994. He also was a member of the board of trustees of the Bauhaus Archive and of the German Design Council.

== Distinctions and awards ==
- Verdienstkreuz des Verdienstorden der Bundesrepublik Deutschland (1985)
- Sonderpreis des Europäischen Design-Preises der EU (1992)
- Bundespreis "Förderer des Design" des Rat für Formgebung (1999)
- Großes Niedersächsisches Verdienstkreuz
- Außerordentliches Mitglied im Bund Deutscher Architekten
- Ehrenmitglied im Verband Deutscher Industrie Designer
- Ehrenmitglied des Deutschen Werkbund Nord
