= Czatkowice, Lower Silesian Voivodeship =

Czatkowice
- Village
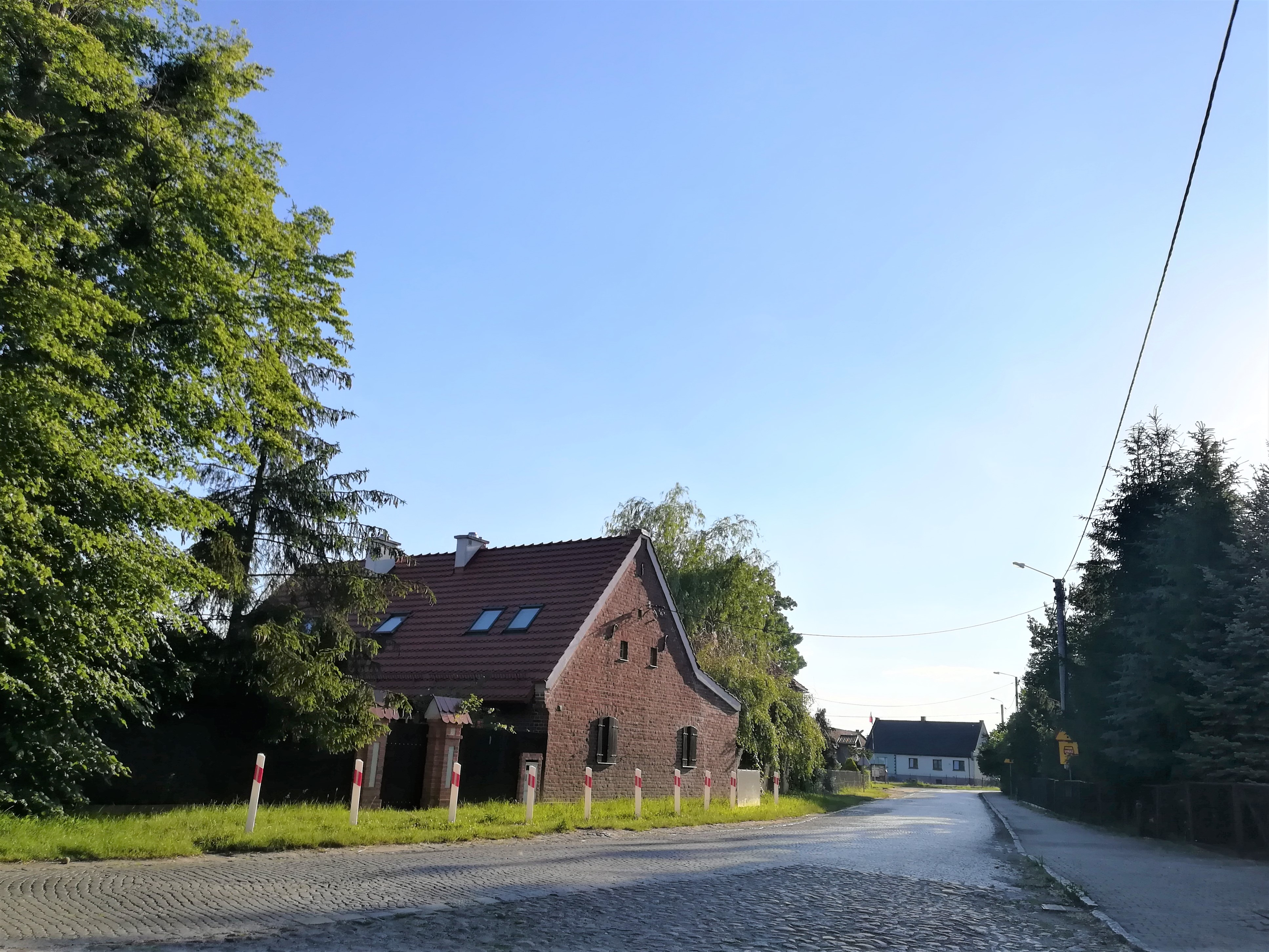

- Location within Poland
- Coordinates: 51°30′47″N 17°22′37″E
- Country: Poland
- Voivodeship: Lower Silesian
- County: Milicz
- Gmina: Milicz
- Population: 450

Czatkowice [t͡ʂatkɔˈvit͡sɛ] is a village in the administrative district of Gmina Milicz, within Milicz County, Lower Silesian Voivodeship, in south-western Poland.
