= Gołkowo, Lower Silesian Voivodeship =

Gołkowo
- Village
- Location within Poland
- Coordinates: 51°36′04″N 17°30′45″E
- Country: Poland
- Voivodeship: Lower Silesian
- County: Milicz
- Gmina: Milicz

Gołkowo [ɡɔu̯ˈkɔvɔ] is a village in the administrative district of Gmina Milicz, within Milicz County, Lower Silesian Voivodeship, in south-western Poland.

== People ==
- Ernst von Heydebrand und der Lasa (1851-1924), German politician
