= Milicz =

Town in Lower Silesian Voivodeship, Poland

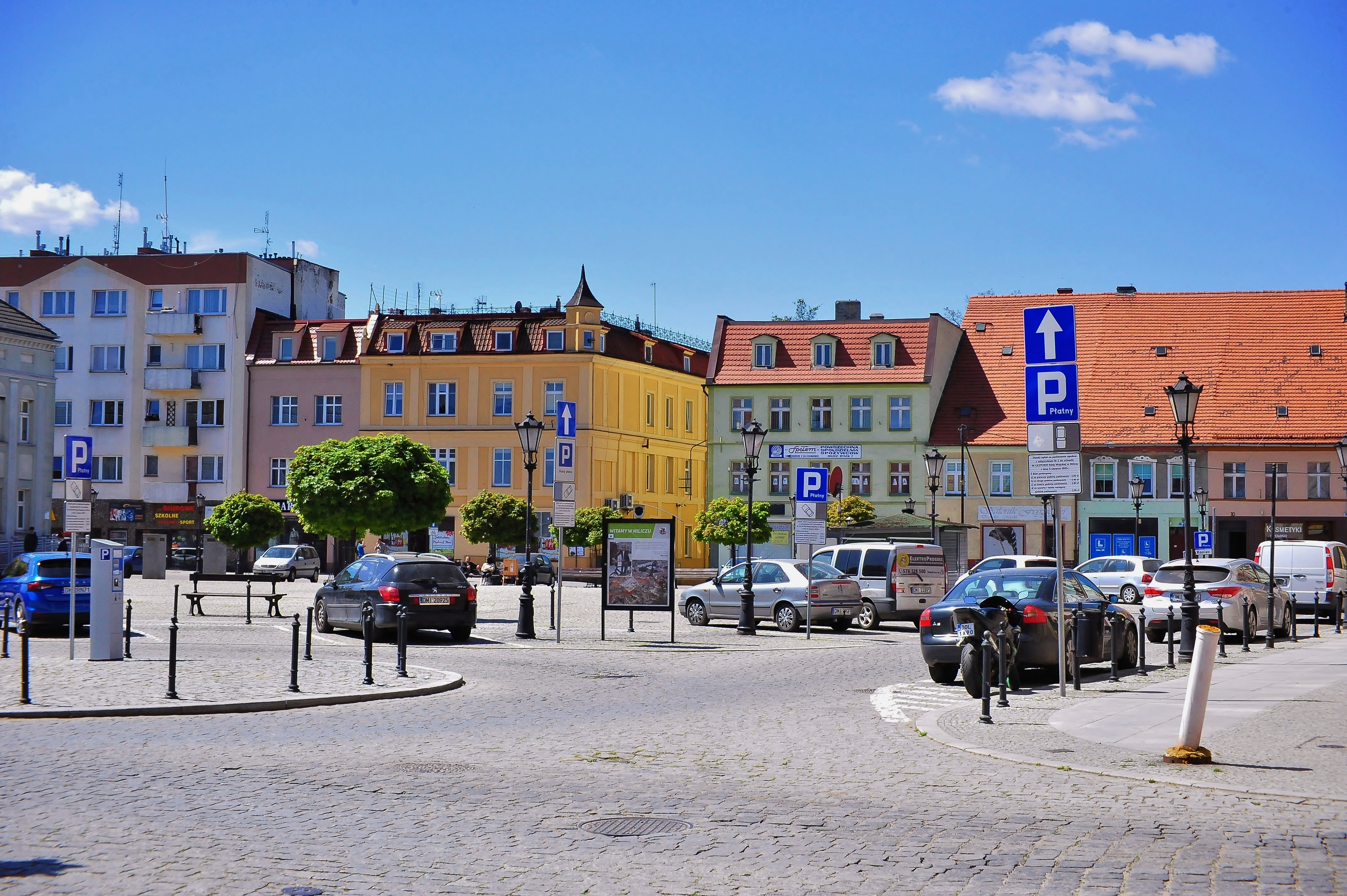
- Main square

- Flag Coat of arms

- Location within Poland
- Coordinates: 51°32′N 17°17′E
- Country: Poland
- Voivodeship: Lower Silesian
- County: Milicz
- Gmina: Milicz
- First mentioned: 1136
- Town rights: 1245

Government
  - Mayor: Wojciech Piskozub

Area
  - Total: 13.50 km^{2} (5.21 sq mi)

Population (2019-06-30)
  - Total: 11,304
  - Density: 837.3/km^{2} (2,169/sq mi)
- Time zone: UTC+1 (CET)
  - Summer (DST): UTC+2 (CEST)
- Postal code: 56-300
- Car plates: DMI
- Website: http://www.milicz.pl

Milicz [ˈmilit͡ʂ] (German: Militsch) is a town in Lower Silesian Voivodeship, in west-central Poland. It is the seat of Milicz County and of Gmina Milicz, part of the larger Wrocław metropolitan area.

== Geography ==
The town is situated in the historic Lower Silesia region, near the border with Greater Poland. The centre is located on the Barycz river, about 55 km (34 mi) north of the regional capital Wrocław. From 1975 to 1998 Milicz belonged to Wrocław Voivodeship.

The Milicz Ponds, an important habitat and breeding ground for water birds, are a nature reserve established 1963 and protected under the Ramsar convention. Since 1996 they also formed part of a larger protected area known as the Barycz Valley Landscape Park.

As of 2019, the town has a population of 11,304.

== History ==
Milicz developed as route of the ancient Amber Trade Route known as the Amber Road. A settlement at the site was possibly established in the 11th century. Milich Castle was first mentioned in an 1136 deed by Pope Innocent II as a property of the cathedral chapter of the Diocese of Wrocław. The name possibly refers to a legendary founder or is derived from Polish: miły, "pleasant", "friendly". It is listed as a possession of the Polish Archdiocese of Gniezno in an 1154 deed issued by Pope Adrian IV, it is later also mentioned under the Latin name Milicium in a 1249 document by Duke Przemysł I of Greater Poland. The Polish name Mylicz first appeared in the Liber fundationis episcopatus Vratislaviensis (Book of endowments of the Bishopric of Wrocław) manuscript written about 1305 at the behest of Bishop Henry of Wierzbnej.

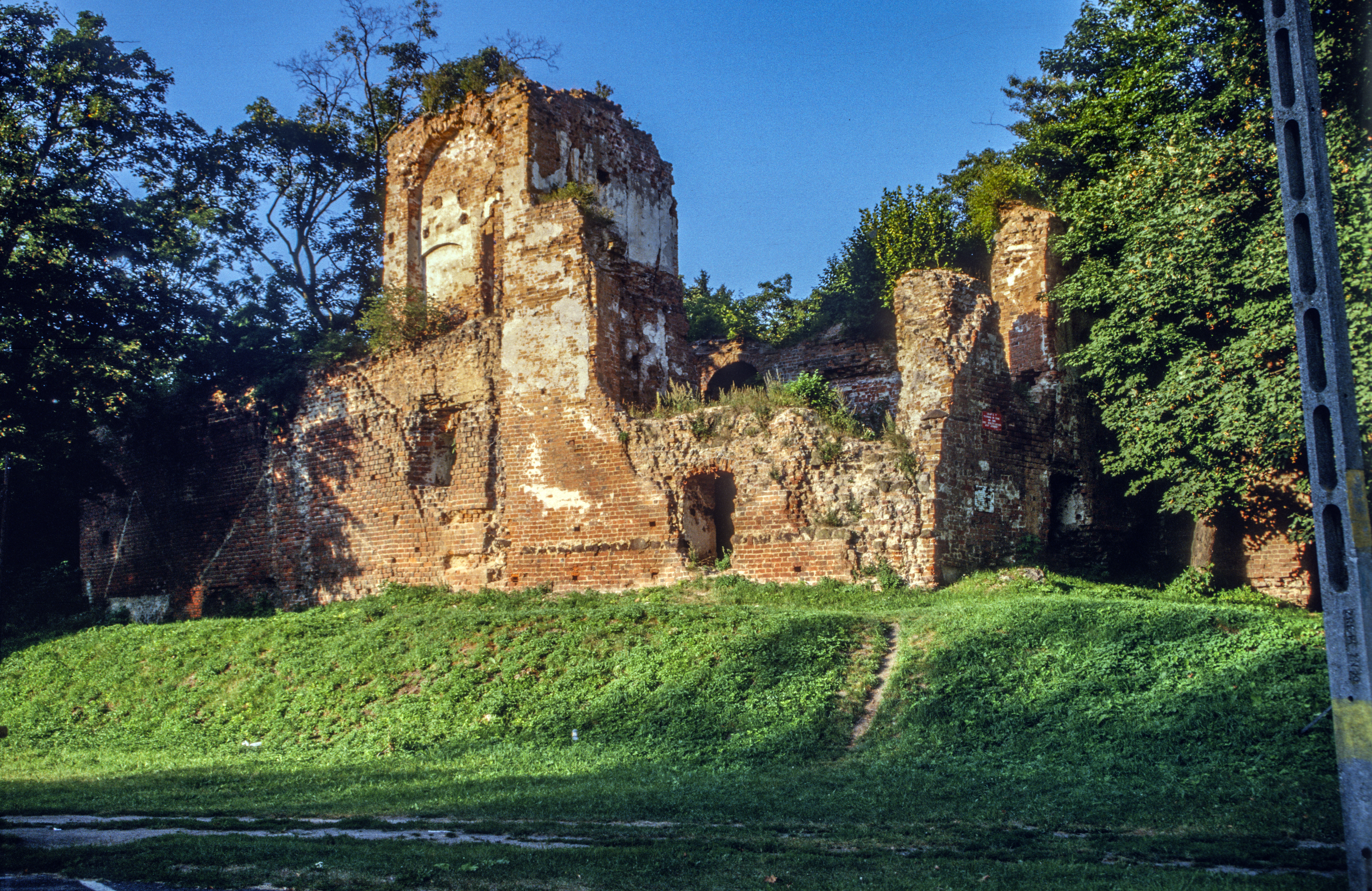
Ruins of Milicz Castle

Upon the death of Polish Duke Bolesław III Wrymouth in 1138, Milicz became part of the Polish Duchy of Silesia, ruled by Duke Bolesław I the Tall from 1163, and was the seat of a castellany. The citizens received town privileges in 1245. In 1294 the area was conquered by Duke Henry III of Głogów and from 1313 belonged to the Silesian Duchy of Oels (Oleśnica), which itself became a Bohemian fiefdom in 1329. In 1358 the Wrocław bishops finally sold their Milicz estates to the Piast duke Konrad I, whose successors had a Gothic castle built. In 1432, the town was attacked by the Hussites. The Oleśnica dukes held the town until in 1492 the line became extinct and the duchy was finally seized as an expired fief by the Bohemian Crown. In 1494 King Vladislas II of Bohemia granted Milicz to his chamberlain Sigismund Kurzbach, who installed the autonomous Silesian state country of Milicz and Żmigród (Trachenberg). The Milicz part was acquired by the Maltzan noble family in 1590.

Militsch was conquered by the Kingdom of Prussia upon the First Silesian War in 1742, and was part of the German Empire from 1871. After Germany's defeat in World War I, Poland re-emerged as an independent country, and Milicz was close to the new border. After the Red Army's Vistula–Oder Offensive and Nazi Germany's defeat in World War II, Milicz became again part of Poland, although with a Soviet-installed communist regime, which stayed in power until the 1980s.

== Sights ==
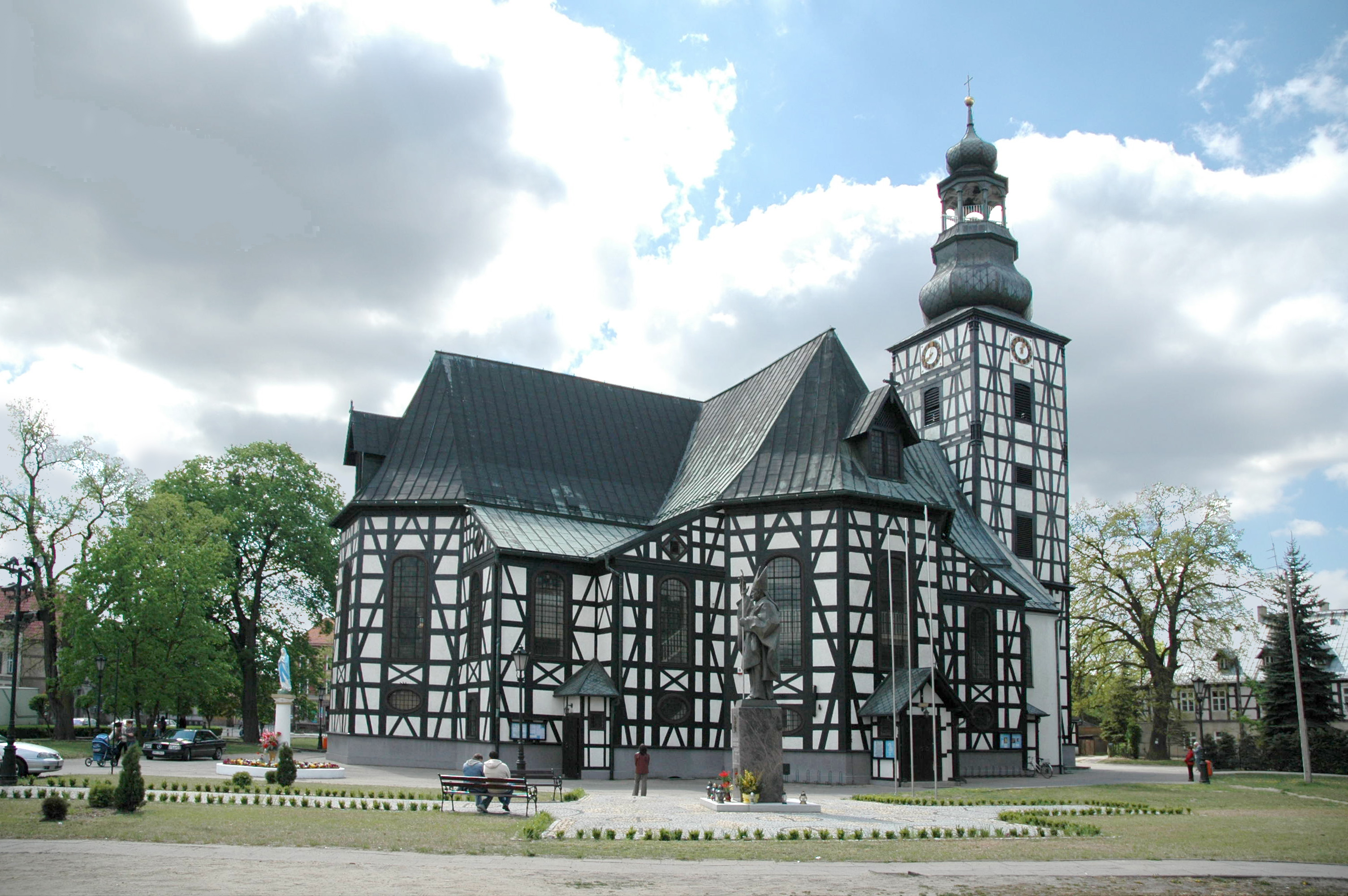
St Andrew Bobola Church

Milicz is the site of one of the six Churches of Grace, which the Silesian Protestants were allowed to build with the permission of Habsburg emperor Joseph I, also King of Bohemia, given at the Altranstädt Convention of 1707. The half-timbered house of worship finished in 1714 today serves as Catholic parish church dedicated to Saint Andrew Bobola.

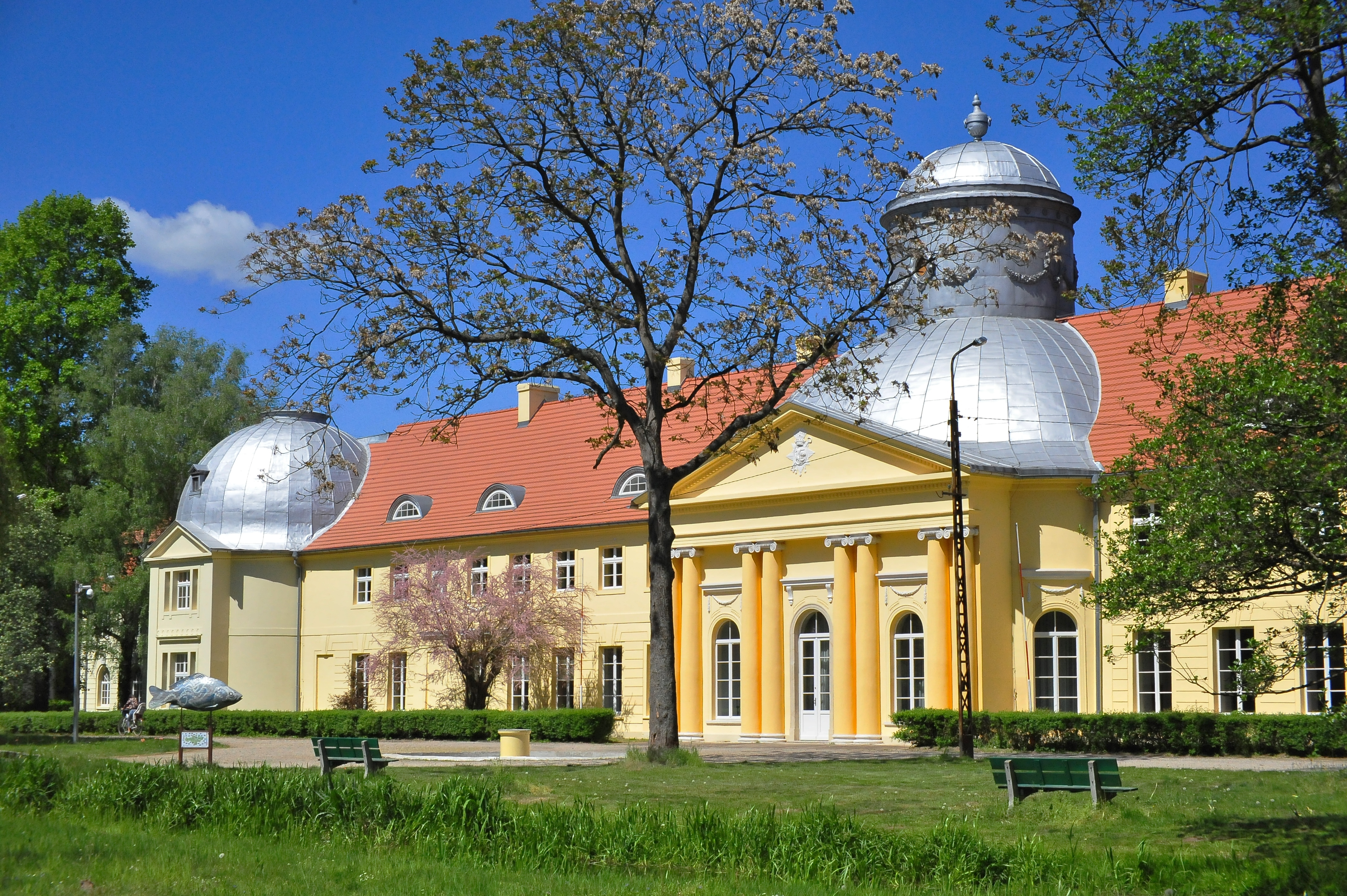
Milicz Palace

The castle of the Oleśnica Dukes erected in the 14th century was destroyed in World War II. The Maltzahn dynasty left a Late Baroque-Neoclassical palace erected in 1798 with an English garden, the first in Silesia. Since 1963 the building is the seat of a secondary forestry college.

== Demographics ==
Historical population

Year	Pop.	±%
1843	2,707	—
1871	3,312	+22.3%
1880	3,486	+5.3%
1890	3,822	+9.6%
1900	3,715	−2.8%
1910	3,873	+4.3%

Year	Pop.	±%
1925	3,717	−4.0%
1933	4,585	+23.4%
1950	4,499	−1.9%
1960	6,103	+35.7%
2010	11,887	+94.8%

== Transport ==
National road 15 passes through Milicz connecting it to Krotoszyn to the north and to Trzebnica in the south.

Vovoideship roads 439 passes through Milicz.

Milicz has a station on the Polish Coal Trunk Line.

== Notable people ==
- Oskar von Heydebrand und der Lasa (1815–1888), landowner and politician
- Maria von Maltzan (1909–1997), resistance fighter. Field Marshal Walther von Reichenau married her niece at the local church.
- Joachim Carl von Maltzan (1733–1817), Prussian diplomat as Minister Plenipotentiary in London
- Oskar Obier (1876–1952), painter
- Edwin Graf von Rothkirch und Trach (1888–1980), officer and show jumping rider
- Carl Wilhelm Ferdinand Guhr (1787–1848) conductor
- Damian Wojtaszek (born 1988), volleyball player
- Hermann Wassertrilling (Hirsch Wassertrilling), rabbi from Boskovice, was active here in the 19th century

== Twin towns – sister cities ==
See twin towns of Gmina Milicz.
