= Gądkowice =

- Village
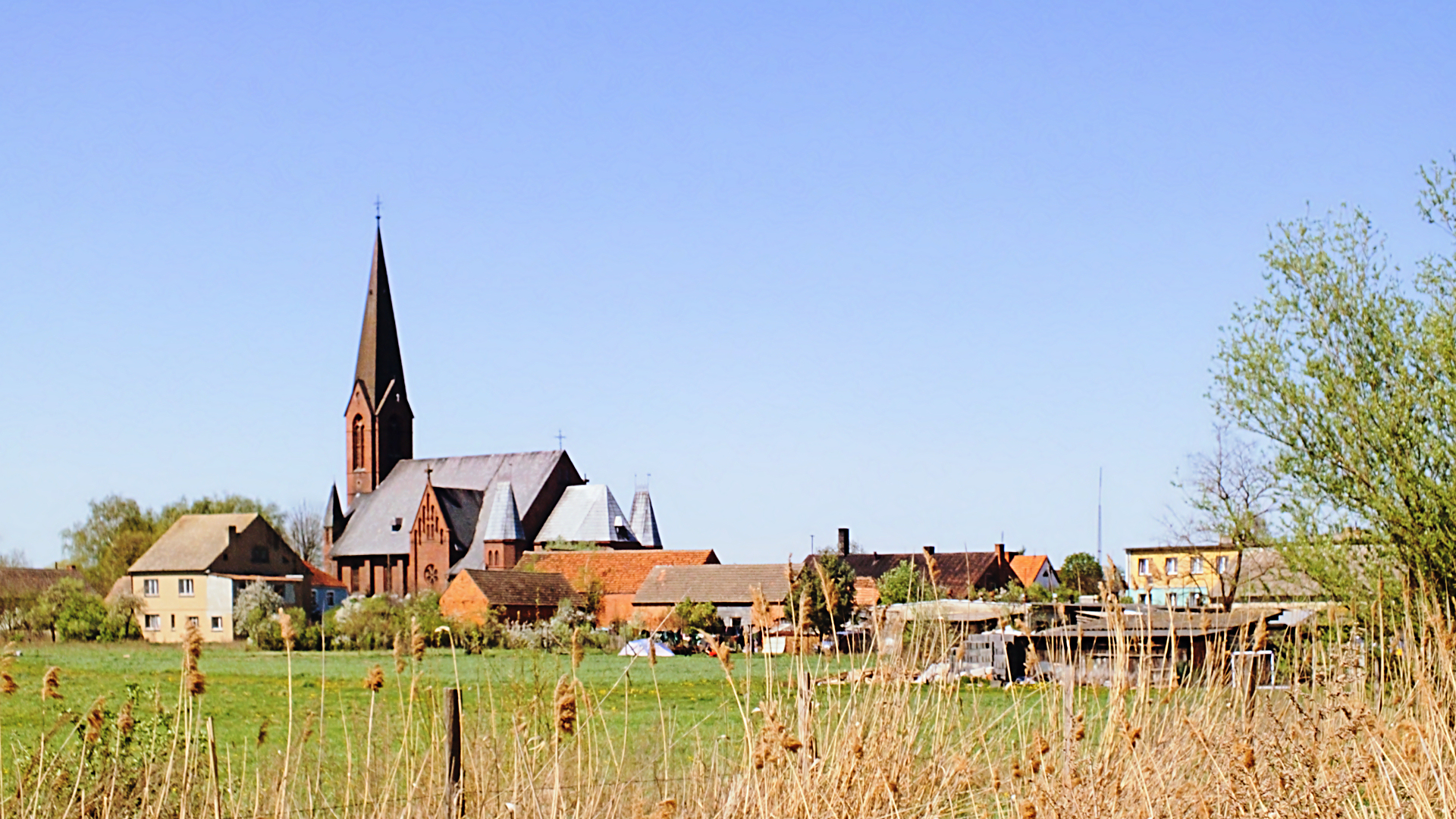
- Gądkowice seen from the south

- Location within Poland
- Coordinates: 51°34′09″N 17°27′12″E
- Country: Poland
- Voivodeship: Lower Silesian
- County: Milicz
- Gmina: Milicz
- Elevation: 110 m (360 ft)
- Population: 450

Gądkowice [ɡɔntkɔˈvit͡sɛ] (From 1945 to 1948 Kalinka; German: Gontkowitz, from 1937 to 1945 Schönkirch) is a village in the administrative district of Gmina Milicz, within Milicz County, Lower Silesian Voivodeship, in south-western Poland.
