= Fs line chair =

The FS Line chair is a product of Wilkhahn, designed by Klaus Franck and Werner Sauer in 1980. The chair is named after its two designers. This was the first single-piece, highly flexible seat shell manufactured by Wilkhahn.

This ergonomically designed chair features a synchronized mechanism that adjusts the seat and backrest positions to accommodate the user's needs with flexibility. This chair also features upholstery fitted like a tyre on a rim. After nearly three decades, this chair is still in production.
