= Nové Hrady =

Nové Hrady may refer to places in the Czech Republic:

- Nové Hrady (České Budějovice District), a town in the South Bohemian Region
- Nové Hrady (Ústí nad Orlicí District), a municipality and village in the Pardubice Region
