= Postolin, Lower Silesian Voivodeship =

Postolin
- Village
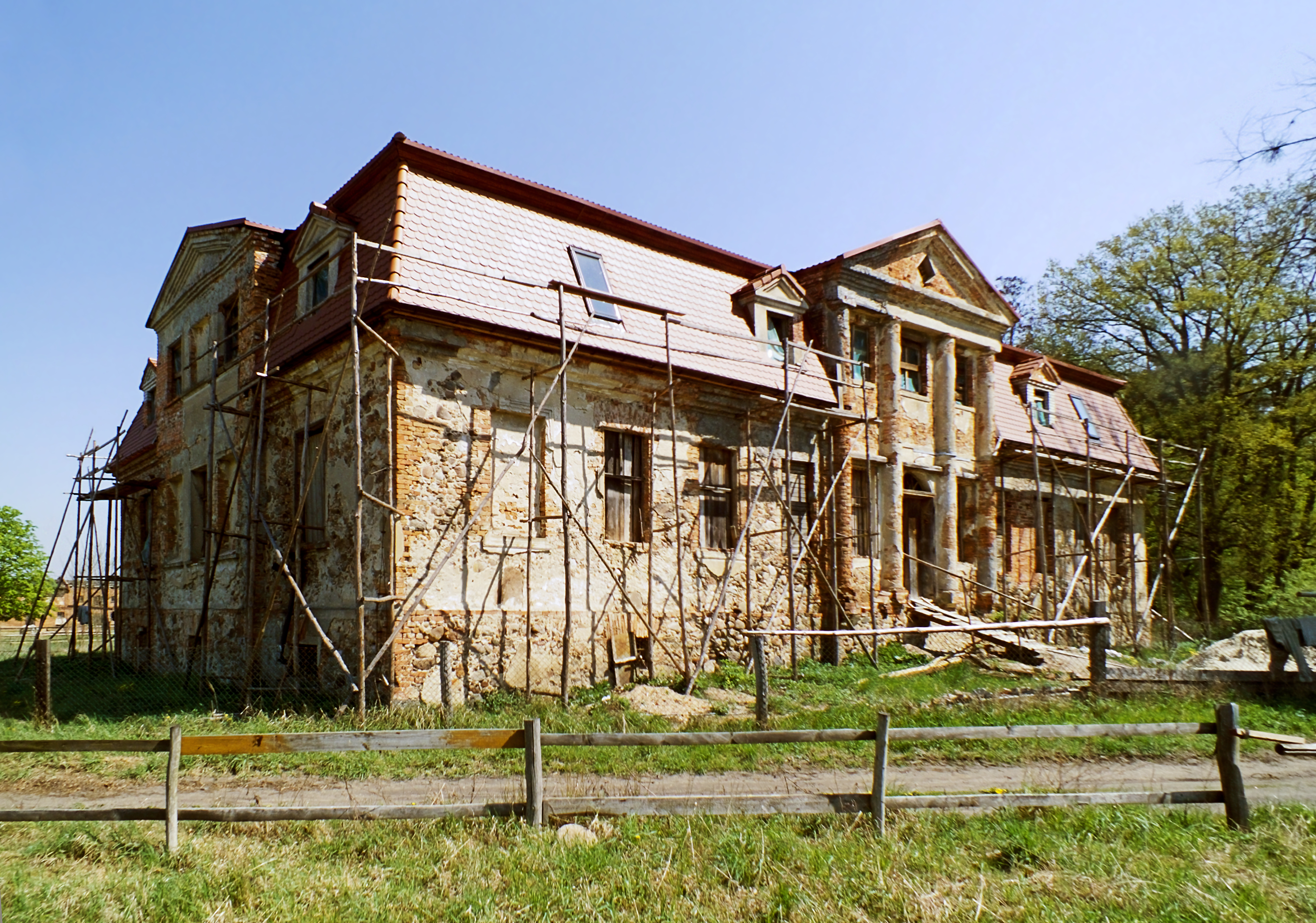
- Manor

- Location within Poland
- Coordinates: 51°29′N 17°15′E
- Country: Poland
- Voivodeship: Lower Silesian
- County: Milicz
- Gmina: Milicz

Postolin [pɔsˈtɔlin] (German: Postel) is a village in the administrative district of Gmina Milicz, within Milicz County, Lower Silesian Voivodeship, in south-western Poland.
