= Postell =

Postell is a surname. Notable people with the surname include:

- Ashley Postell (born 1986), American gymnast
- James Postell Douglas (1836-1901), American politician and businessman
- Lavor Postell (born 1978), American basketball player
- Richard Postell (died 1400), British Christian canon and dean

== See also ==
- Postel, surname
