= Wilkhahn =

German furniture company

Wilkening + Hahne GmbH+Co.KG
- Genre: Office Furniture
- Founded: 1907
- Founder: Friedrich Hahne, Christian Wilkening
- Headquarters: Bad Münder, Germany
- Website: www.wilkhahn.com

Wilkhahn (Wilkening + Hahne GmbH+Co.KG), based in Bad Münder, Lower Saxony, is a German manufacturer of office furniture. The brand is well known for its range of ergonomic office chairs and tables. Founded in 1907 by Friedrich Hahne and Christian Wilkening. The name of the two founders was later used to create the name Wilk-hahn in 1954.

The sons of the founders, Fritz Hahne and Adolf Wilkening took over the reins of the company after World War II and continued to make wooden chairs and furniture until the mid-1950s. The introduction of new materials such as steel, fibreglass, and newer fabrics for upholstery, and the early development of plastic enabled Wilkhahn to transform the business from a highly manual craft to a modern industrial production company with international operations. As a result, the modern chair evolved, with notable releases as the FS Line, Picto, Modus, A-line and ON.

Wilkhahn is also known for the architecture of its production sites, the pavilions in wood-hanging construction by Frei Otto, already famous for his work on the Munich Olympic Stadium, and the production halls by architect Thomas Herzog.

== History ==
In 1907, Friedrich Hahne and Christian Wilkening founded a chair-making factory in Eimbeckhausen near Hanover. They made solid beech chairs from wood from nearby forests. The manufacturing plant did not differ much from the other approximately 100 small and medium-sized chair manufacturers in the area.

In the 1940s Fritz Hahne and Adolf Wilkening took over their fathers' chair factory. Business ran well, but they looked for new design paths and took up contact with Walter Heyn, the director of Deutsche Werkstätten, and with designers such as Georg Leowald and Herbert Hirche whose work was influenced by the Bauhaus and the Deutscher Werkbund.

In the 1950s, the company obtained designers such as Herbert Hirche, Georg Leowald, Roland Rainer, Jupp Ernst and Helmut Lohmeier.
Wilkhahn became a pioneer of German industrial design, experimented with new materials and evolved its own distinct design. This resulted in purist furniture, the form of which was developed in strict adherence to function.

In 1954 Wilkhahn was one of the first German companies which introduce a company pension scheme. This marked the foundation stone for the Wilkhahn corporate culture. Fritz Hahne, who managed the company from 1946 to 1982, looked for new ways of enabling employees to share actively in the company's success. He established the maxim "No orders without explanations". The goal: a relationship based on partnership and responsibility. At a staff meeting in December 1970 Fritz Hahne announced a 50% profit-sharing scheme for employees to come into effect in January 1971. As dormant partners, staff today have significant shareholdings of the company's capital.

In 1980 Klaus Frank and Werner Sauer developed a new office swivel chair following intensive ergonomic studies and series of tests. The FS-Line marked the consistent implementation of the principle of dynamic sitting. More than 2 million of these chairs have been sold to date. In this decade Wilkhahn also became more international. Sales offices and subsidiaries were established, foreign trading and license partners were retained to work for Wilkhahn. Today, business outside Germany accounts about 50% of total sales.

In 1987 new production sites – pavilions in wood-hanging construction by Frei Otto – were built. The production halls in Eimbeckhausen have been completed in 1993. They were designed by Thomas Herzog and have been regarded throughout the world as a model of aesthetic and environmentally compatible building construction.

In 1995 the Picto swivel chair was developed by Wilkhahn. In 2005 the Aline chair was presented to the public. Wilkhahn celebrated its 100th anniversary in 2007. In 2009 was the market launch of the new ON chair, which has a three-dimensional dynamic sitting arrangement.

== Designers ==
The opportunity to form shapes from the new materials such as steel, fibreglass, and newer fabrics for upholstery inspired Wilkhahn designers:

- 1954–1957 Chairs designed by Georg Leowald for the home and office
- 1955–1959 The three-legged chair introduced, based on Walter Papst's design. This chair was to be reinstated in 2009 and is made from solid timber.
- 1971 The introduction of the first two-piece swivel chairs designed by Wilhelm Ritz.
- 1980 The introduction of chair with many seating variants.
- 1991 The first office chair designed completely under ecological criteria designed by Burkhard Schmitz and Franz Biggel. Created from eight different recyclable, CFC free materials.

== Sustainability ==
Concern about environmental issues started back in the 1970s with the appointment of an environmental manager to develop the company's future ecological strategies. Wilkhahn was one of the first German companies to achieve the environmental accreditation now known as the ISO 14001 Standard and EMAS (Eco-Management and Audit Scheme). It was the first time a complete Input-Output analysis had been tested in a furniture company under scientific control.
