= Sergei Kolyada =

Russian artist

Sergei Kolyada with Kouneka, Moscow 1988

Sergei Avksentyevich Kolyada (Russian: Сергеӣ Авксентьевиҷ Коляда) (18 June 1907 – 16 August 1996) was a Soviet portraitist, still life and landscape artist.

Most notable amongst the artist's work is the "Old Moscow" series which is considered an important historical record and faithful witness of the landscapes of "Old Moscow" that are increasingly disappearing under the tide of modern development. Each of the subjects of Kolyada's works in this series were painstakingly researched using archival records and other sources.

== Biography ==
Kolyada was born in Moscow in 1907. At the age of 18, he was admitted as an apprentice to the studio of famous artist Nikolay Krymov. Krymov's mastery of impression and light is considered to have had an important influence on Kolyada's future artistic career.

Kolyada's apprenticeship was followed by four years of study at the prestigious Superior Institute of Arts and Techniques Vkhutemas-Vhutein under David Shterenberg and Sergey Vasilyevich Gerasimov after which he joined the OST (Society of Easel Painters) for two years prior to its disbandment by the authorities.

The beginning of Kolyada's career coincided with the establishment of Soviet Socialist realism as the only authorized style of art. As with numerous artists of that time, Kolyada worked not only for the state in an official capacity; but also created a large body of impressive private works, including portraits, still lives and landscapes. Although he was admitted into the Union of Artists of the USSR in 1972 and participated in many group exhibitions, during his lifetime he did not gain the prestige of colleagues who fulfilled the Party's plans for Art depicting “Revolutionary Russia.” He kept his personal and artistic integrity, perhaps at the expense of lost opportunities for advancement. In 1945, a great number of his early paintings (including a number of avant-garde works created during his years of studies at the Vhutemas-Vhutein and in the following years) were destroyed in a suspicious fire at his parents home near the town of Tartsev, Smolensk area, where Sergei used to spend his holidays every year.

Kolyada was a co-founder of the Society of Painters of the Moscow region. After the Second World War, he participated in a few artistic missions in the “Pouchinsky-Gory” region (which inspired Pouchkine) and in the kolkhozes of the Moscow region during the 1950s.

In the 1960s, he started painting the landscapes of “his” old Moscow; a one of his works that he continued for over 30 years.

In his last years, Kolyada travelled, painted and exhibited outside the USSR in Australia and France.

He died in his beloved home town of Moscow in 1996 at the age of 89.

== Career ==
Besides a great number of group exhibitions, including at the prestigious Tretyakov Gallery and the Moscow City Hall for the 850th Anniversary of Moscow foundation (1997); Kolyada's long career is marked by important solo exhibitions in the Krimsky-Val Gallery and the Glinka Museum, Three important Moscow Museums hold a dozen of Kolyada's works acquired when the artist was still alive: The State Tretyakov Gallery, The Moscow Historical Museum and the Lounatcharsky Museum.

Since his passing, his work has received increasing recognition and interest abroad, with some of his works included in 5 different exhibitions at the Museum of Russian Art in Minneapolis in the United States. His artworks are also held in a number of private collections in the United States, United Kingdom, France, Australia and Russia.

== Exhibitions ==
- 1947 All-Union Art Exhibition - Artists from the Moscow region
- 1949 All-Union Art Exhibition - Moscow
- 1953 All-Union Art Exhibition – Moscow
- 1959 All-Union Art Exhibition "Portrait Painters" - Moscow
- 1966 Exhibition of works: "In memory of Moscow's Defenders". (Dedicated to the 25th anniversary of the defeat of Fascist troops near Moscow)
- 1968 All-Union Art Exhibition - Artists from the Moscow area: "My region of Moscow"
- 1977 All-Union Art Exhibition: " The Self-Portrait in the Soviet and Russian Art" Tretiakov Gallery - Moscow (Catalogue p 50)
- 1980 Solo exhibition - Glinka Museum - Moscow
- 1980 All-Union Art Exhibition: "Moscow in the Soviet and Russian Art", Tretiakov Gallery - Moscow (Catalogue p 143)
- 1985 Solo exhibition: "My Moscow" (In Honour of Artist's 75th Birthday)
- 1990 Solo exhibition - Stoliarski School of Music – Brisbane, Australia
- 1991 Solo exhibition - Russian Club – Brisbane, Australia
- 1991 Group exhibition - Central House of the Artists - New Tretiakov Gallery "Russian artists of the 1920s and 1930s" (Catalogue, 1991, p. 60)
- 1992 Solo exhibition – Etretat, France
- 1994 Retrospective exhibition "Central House of the Artist" - Krimsky-val, Moscow; Paris; Etretat; Moscow
- 1997 Group exhibition at the "White House - Moscow" for the 850th anniversary of the foundation of Moscow
- 1999 Solo exhibition - St Pierre des Corps - Tours, France
- 2003 Solo exhibition - St Hilaire de Riez, France
- 2006 Group exhibition – "Museum of Russian Art", USA - Russian Realism: Art of the 20th Century
- 2007 January 8–21 April) Group exhibition – "Museum of Russian Art", USA - Colors of a Russian Winter
- 2007 (30 April – 1 September) Group Exhibition - "Museum of Russian Art", USA - Soviet Bread Basket
- 2007 (19 February – 5 May) Group Exhibition - "Museum of Russian Art", USA - The Milkmaids and Friends
- 2008 Group exhibition – "Museum of Russian Art", USA - Russian Impressionism: On the Edge of Soviet Art
