= Milicz County =

Coordinates: 51°32′N 17°17′E

Milicz County Powiat milicki
- County
- Flag Coat of arms

- Location within the voivodeship
- Country: Poland
- Voivodeship: Lower Silesian
- Seat: Milicz
- Gminas: Total 3: Gmina Cieszków; Gmina Krośnice; Gmina Milicz

Area
  - Total: 715.01 km^{2} (276.07 sq mi)

Population (2019-06-30)
  - Total: 37,003
  - Density: 51.752/km^{2} (134.04/sq mi)
  - Urban: 11,304
  - Rural: 25,699
- Car plates: DMI
- Website: www.milicz-powiat.pl

Milicz County (Polish: powiat milicki) is a unit of territorial administration and local government (powiat) in Lower Silesian Voivodeship, south-western Poland. It came into being on January 1, 1999, as a result of the Polish local government reforms passed in 1998. The county covers an area of 715 square kilometres (276.1 sq mi). Its administrative seat and only town is Milicz.

As of 2019 the total population of the county is 37,003, out of which the population of Milicz is 11,304 and the rural population is 25,699.

The Milicz County is made up of three boroughs: Milicz, Krośnice, and Cieszków. The county is famous for its forests and ponds. The Milicz Ponds built in the 13th century by the Cistercian monks are nowadays the biggest centre of carp-culture in Poland. The unique flora and fauna of this region were the main reason for which the Nature Centre "the Barycz Valley" was set up here. The Milicz County provides suitable conditions for development of small and average businesses. The county possesses also many grounds prepared for investments - in order to encourage new investors, the local authorities offer them tax privileges. The most important investment carried out over the last few years is the enlargement of the local hospital. The institution opened in 1999 is now a modern establishment providing patients with medical services. The hospital, which has 240 beds at its disposal, possesses 9 common and specialistic departments. The institution has also specialistic dispensaries offering services in the fields of common surgery, traumatology, orthopaedic surgery, gynaecology, allergology, ophthalmology and treatment of glaucoma, otolaryngology, treatment of tuberculosis, and illnesses of lungs.

== Neighbouring counties ==
Milicz County is bordered by Krotoszyn County to the north, Ostrów County to the east, Oleśnica County and Trzebnica County to the south, and Rawicz County to the west.

== Administrative divisions ==
The county is subdivided into three gminas (one urban-rural and two rural). These are listed in the table below, in decreasing order of population.

Gmina	Type	Area (km^{2})	Population (2019)	Seat
Gmina Milicz	urban-rural	435.61	24,172	Milicz
Gmina Krośnice	rural	178.73	8,151	Krośnice
Gmina Cieszków	rural	100.67	4,680	Cieszków
