= Bieńkowice, Wrocław =

District in Wrocław, Poland

Bieńkowice
- District of Wrocław
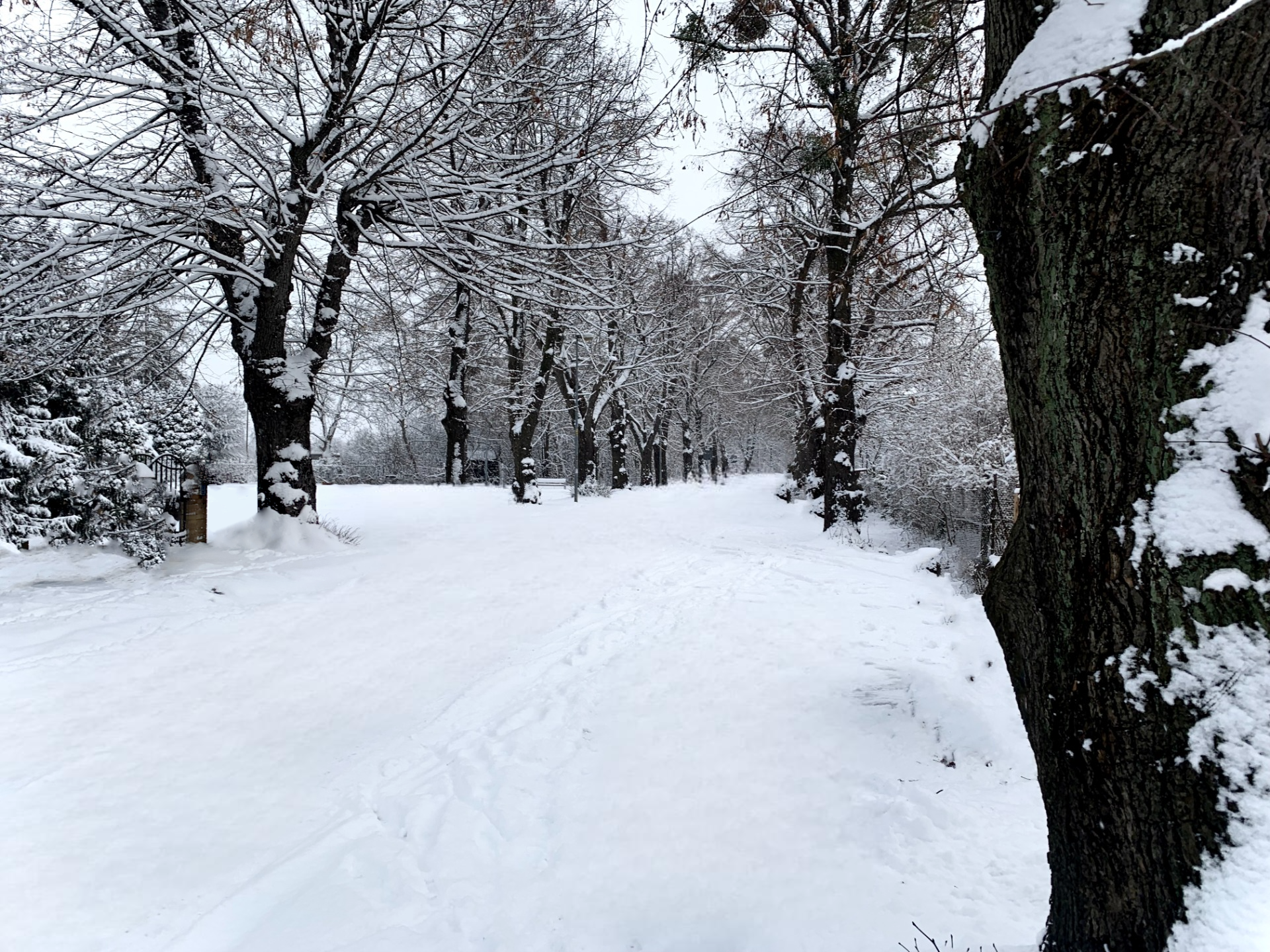

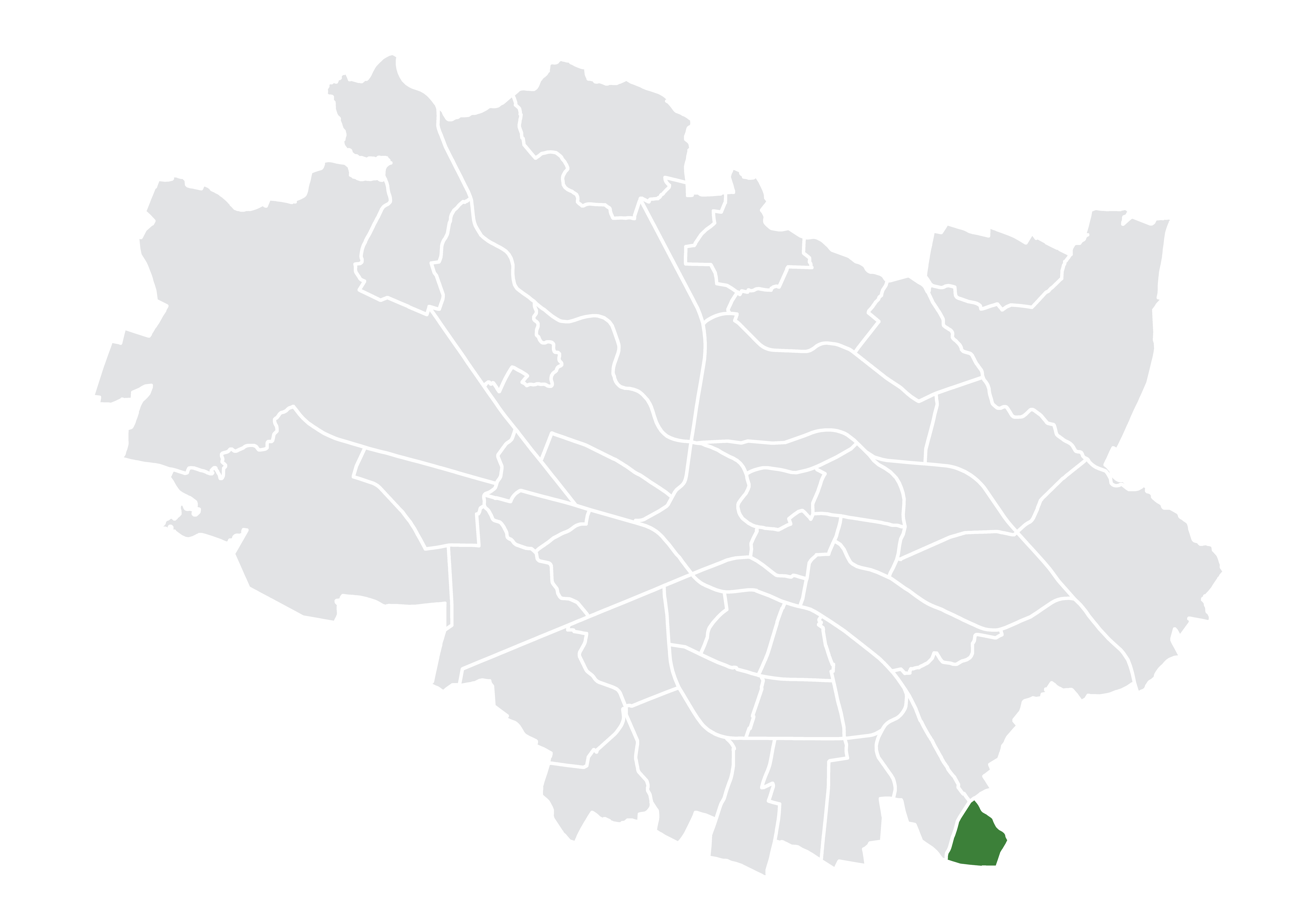
- Location of Bieńkowice within Wrocław
- Country: Poland
- Voivodeship: Lower Silesian
- County/City: Wrocław
- First mentioned: 1282
- Incorporated into the city: 1951
- Established the modern-day district: 1991

Population (2022)
  - Total: 577
- Time zone: UTC+1 (CET)
  - Summer (DST): UTC+2 (CEST)
- Area code: +48 71

Bieńkowice (Polish pronunciation: [bjɛɲkɔˈvit͡sɛ], German: Benkwitz, [ˈbɛŋkvɪt͡s]) is a district of Wrocław, Poland, located in the southeastern part of the city. It was established in the territory of the former Krzyki district.

As a district near the city's border, it neighbours the villages of Iwiny, Zacharzyce and Radwanice, as well as the Brochów district of Wrocław. The northern and eastern parts of the district are dominated by railroad land.

Initially a village, the settlement was incorporated into Wrocław in 1951.

== Name ==
The modern name is thought to be derived from the name Bieniek, the diminutive of Benedykt, who is believed to have been the protoplast of the family and founder of the village.

== History ==
The earliest record of the settlement dates back to 1282. At the end of the 19th century, despite the fact that Lower Silesia had not belonged to Poland, Polish was still spoken in Bieńkowice.

The village was incorporated into Wrocław in 1951. In 1991, after reforms in the administrative division of Wrocław, Bieńkowice became one of the city's 48 districts.

In 2021, Bieńkowice (along with Świniary) was recognised by the wroclaw.pl news agency as the safest district in Wrocław.
