= Józef Kut =

Polish Roman Catholic priest and martyr

Blessed Józef Kut

Priest & Martyr
- Born: 21 January 1905; Sławin
- Died: 18 September 1942 (aged 37); Dachau
- Beatified: 13 June 1999, Warsaw by Pope John Paul II
- Feast: 12 June

Józef Kut (21 January 1905 – 18 September 1942) was a Polish and Roman Catholic priest. He died in a Nazi concentration camp. He is one of the 108 Martyrs of World War II who were beatified by Pope John Paul II in 1999.

== Biography ==
Kut was born in Sławin; he was the oldest son of Józef and Marianna Kut (née Piaskowska). He was baptized at 22 January 1905 at Gostyczyna. He first attended school at Gostyczyna, and began to attend gymnasium at Ostrów Wielkopolski in 1918. He potentially witnessed the creation of the Republic of Ostrów the same year. After obtaining his matura in 1924, he began attending the seminary in Poznań and Gniezno. He was ordained a priest on 16 June 1929 at Poznań Cathedral by Walenty Dymek. He first served as parish vicar at Chodzież, after which he served as vicar of the Church of St. Marzin in Poznań between 1930 and 1936.

On 6 October 1941, Kut was arrested by the Gestapo and held at Fort VII; he was transferred two weeks later to Dachau, where he was given the prison number 28074. He would die of hunger there on 18 September 1942. Kut was beatified as one of the 108 Martyrs of World War II on 13 June 1999 by Pope John Paul II.

== See also ==
- List of Nazi-German concentration camps
- The Holocaust in Poland
- World War II casualties of Poland
