= Trestno =

Part of Blizanowice in Lower Silesian, Poland

- Settlement
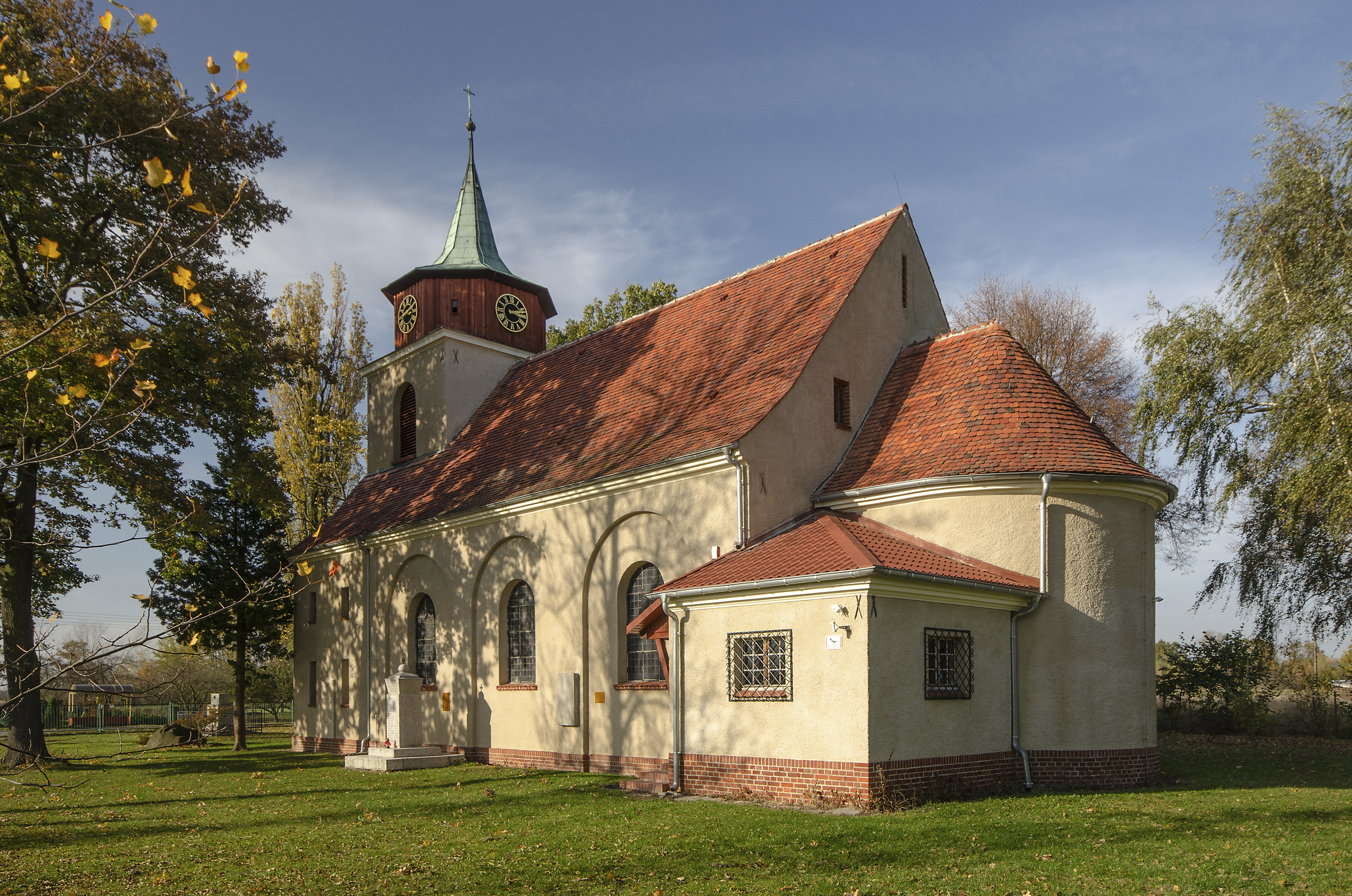

- Location within Poland
- Coordinates: 51°04′44″N 17°08′42″E
- Country: Poland
- Voivodeship: Lower Silesian
- County: Wrocław
- Gmina: Siechnice
- Village: Blizanowice
- Population (2023): 93

Trestno (Polish pronunciation: [ˈtrɛstnɔ], German: Treschen, [ˈtʁɛʃən]) is a settlement of Blizanowice village in Poland, located in Wroclaw County in Lower Silesian Voivodeship, on the left bank of the Oder river. From 1975 to 1998, the locality administratively belonged to Wroclaw Province.

The settlement lies between the Oder to the northeast, Wroclaw to the northwest, Mokry Dwór to the southwest and the main settlement of Blizanowice to the southeast.

== History ==
The settlement was first mentioned in 1216. In 1221, the Brothers Hospitallers of the Blessed Virgin Mary, whom were brought to Wroclaw in 1214 by Henry I the Bearded and Hedwig of Silesia, were granted the ownership of the village by Henry I, as a gift for preserving the rule of St. Augustine.

At the beginning of the 16th century, the village was taken over by the city, but soon sold to Protestants, who built a church there. In 1654 the church was taken over by Catholics; at that time there was, as recorded in documents, an altar with a painted image of the Virgin Mary and the Three Kings, and next to it there was a rectory. In later years, when the village fell into decline, it was incorporated into the parish of St. Maurice.

In 1710, a manor house was built in the settlement, which was later rebuilt in the 1930s and destroyed in 1945. in 1934, the Lutherans built a new church, designed by the German architect Erich Grau. In 1945, the church was taken over by the Catholics, and the village was incorporated into the Parish of the Blessed Virgin Mary, Helper of Christians in Wroclaw, and the Wroclaw Archbishop's Curia received the local landed property for the seminary in the 1950s.

In July 1997, the village was affected by the Central European flood, as it was flooded to a height of more than 2.5 meters.

In the present day, Trestno is home to a church, former Protestant cemetery, and a bus terminal.

== Gallery ==
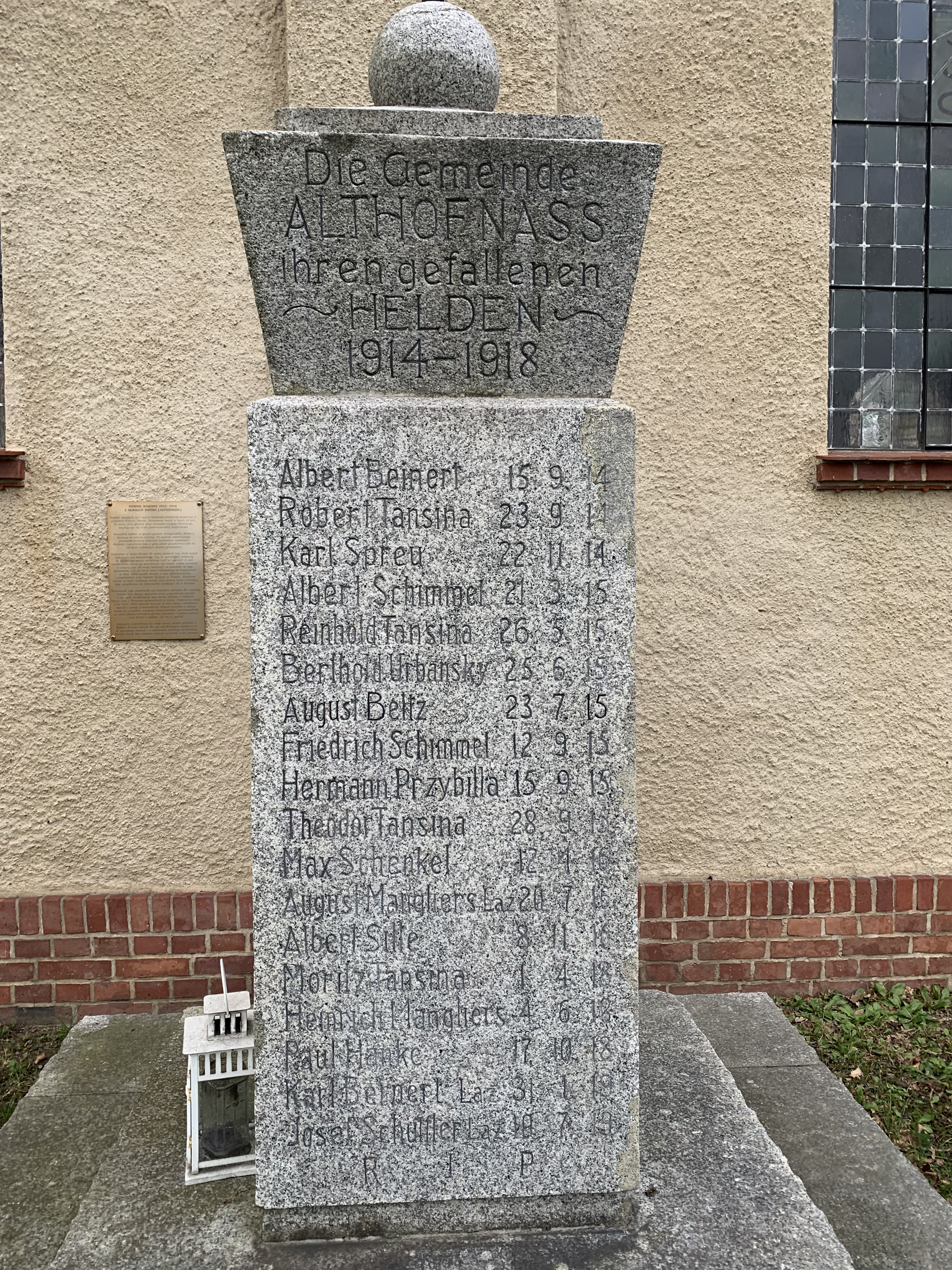
A memorial in Trestno commemorating Althofnass residents fallen in World War I

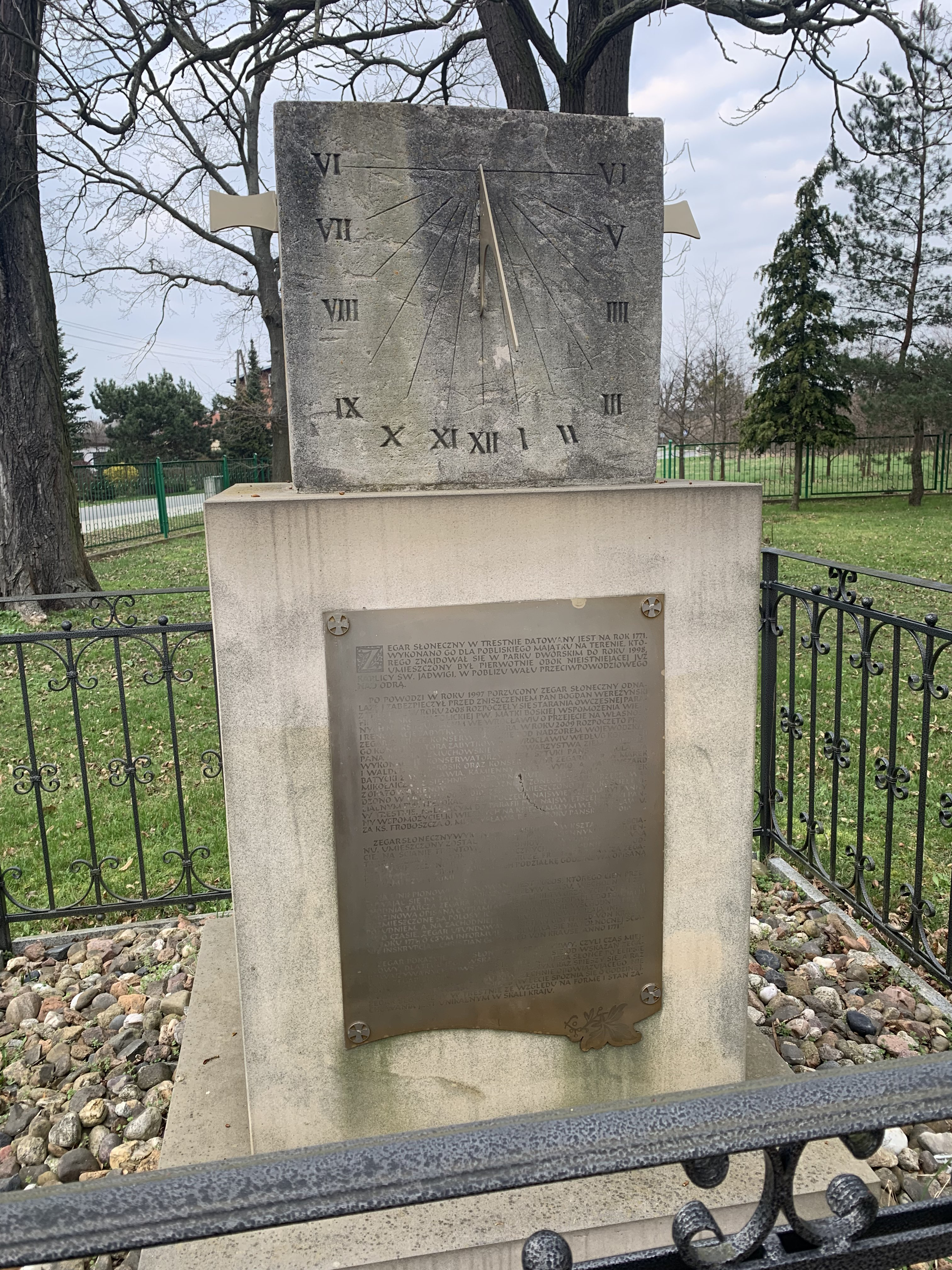
A historic sundial in Trestno
