= Sulęcin (disambiguation) =

Sulęcin may refer to the following places in Poland:

- Sulęcin, a town in Lubusz Voivodeship (W Poland)
- Sulęcin, Lower Silesian Voivodeship (south-west Poland)
- Sulęcin, Greater Poland Voivodeship (west-central Poland)
