= Grodziszów =

- Village
- Location within Poland
- Coordinates: 50°59′46″N 17°09′53″E
- Country: Poland
- Voivodeship: Lower Silesian
- County: Wrocław
- Gmina: Siechnice

Grodziszów [ɡrɔˈd͡ʑiʂuf] is a village in the administrative district of Gmina Siechnice, within Wrocław County, Lower Silesian Voivodeship, in south-western Poland. It is about 6 km (4 mi) south-east of Święta Katarzyna, and 17 km (11 mi) south-east of the regional capital Wrocław.
