= Paweł Skórzewski =

Polish Brigadier General

- Born: July 29, 1744; Mączniki, Poland
- Died: 1819

Paweł Skórzewski (Ogończyk coat of arms) (born July 29, 1744 in Mączniki – died in 1819) was a Polish Brigadier General of the Duchy of Warsaw, a member of the Bar Confederation, a delegate to the Polish Sejm, senator of the Kingdom of Poland and wojewoda of Kalisz.
