= Śmiłów =

Śmiłów may refer to the following places:

- Śmiłów, Greater Poland Voivodeship (west-central Poland)
- Śmiłów, Masovian Voivodeship (east-central Poland)
- Śmiłów, Świętokrzyskie Voivodeship (south-central Poland)
