= IWRG La Fortaleza =

2015 International Wrestling Revolution Group event

La Fortaleza
- Promotion: International Wrestling Revolution Group
- Date: March 4, 2015
- City: Naucalpan, State of Mexico
- Venue: Arena Naucalpan

Event chronology
| ← Previous; Rebelión de los Juniors | Next → Guerra del Golfo |

La Fortaleza (Spanish for "The Fortress") was a major professional wrestling produced and scripted held by the Mexican Lucha libre promotion International Wrestling Revolution Group (IWRG) on March 4, 2015. La Fortaleza refers to the main event ten-man steel cage match where the last man remaining in the cage would be forced to remove their wrestling mask or have their hair shaved off per Lucha de Apuestas, or "bet match", rules. La Fortaleza featured a team representing IWRG and a team representing the rival AAA promotion, furthering a scripted rivalry between the two companies.

In the main event IWRG representative Cerebro Negro was the last wrestler in the ring as AAA wrestler Súper Fly left the ring. As a result Cerebro Negro had all his hair shaved off as per Lucha libre traditions. The show featured four additional matches, including a match to determine which team would become the number one contenders for the IWRG Intercontinental Tag Team Championship, a match won by Los Comandos Elite (Oficial Rayan and Oficial Spector).

== Production ==
=== Background ===
The Mexican professional wrestling promotion International Wrestling Revolution Group (IWRG) has had a tradition of holding multi-man steel cage matches where the last man in the cage would be forced to either unmask if masked or have his hair shaved off if unmasked, in the Lucha de Apuestas, or "bet match", tradition of lucha libre. The earliest recorde steel cage match in IWRG was on February 9, 1997, just one year after IWRG's creation. Starting in 2000 IWRG has held an annual event called IWRG El Castillo del Terror ("The Tower of Terror") with a steel cage match main event. They later added other variations of the steel cage match as well, such as the IWRG Prison Fatal ("Deadly Prison"), IWRG Guerra del Golfo ("Gulf War"), and IWRG Guerra de Sexos ("War of the Sexes"). 2015 was the first year IWRG held an event using the La Fortaleza ("The Fortress") name for one of the Steel Cage match shows, with no 2016 Fortaleza event announced.

During a show on April 29, 2010 AAA wrestler Silver King showed up for the show, allegedly to promote a movie, to signal the beginning of IWRG and AAA working together for the first time as well as starting a long-running rivalry between the two promotions. In subsequent years AAA wrestlers appeared on multiple IWRG, including Los Psycho Circus (Psycho Clown, Monster Clown and Murder Clown) winning the IWRG Intercontinental Trios Championship. AAA also sent participants to IWRG's 2011 Guerra de Empresas ("War of the Promotions") tournament, where Psycho Clown and Murder Clown defeated Super Crazy and X-Fly in the finals to win the tournament. Two months later Los Psycho Circus and Los Perros del Mal ("The Bad Dogs") defeated Los Oficiales in the main event of the La Jaula del Honor ("The Cage of Honor") show. During the summer of 2011 IWRG held a follow-up event called La Jaula de la Muerte ("The Cage of Death") where Los Psycho Circus lost the IWRG Intercontinental Trios Championship in the main event.

=== Storylines ===
The event featured five professional wrestling matches with different wrestlers involved in pre-existing scripted feuds, plots and storylines. Wrestlers were portrayed as either heels (referred to as rudos in Mexico, those that portray the "bad guys") or faces (técnicos in Mexico, the "good guy" characters) as they followed a series of tension-building events, which culminated in a wrestling match or series of matches.

In the main event of the show six wrestlers represented IWRG: Cerebro Negro (unmasked), Apolo Estrada Jr. (unmasked), Electro Boy (masked), Eterno (unmasked), Golden Magic (masked) and Universo 2000 Jr. (masked), while Súper Fly (unmasked), Argenis (masked), Black Mamba (unmasked), Machine Rocker (masked), El Niño Hamburguesa (unmasked) and Venum (masked) represented AAA. According to the rules no wrestler was allowed to escape the steel cage in the first ten minutes of the match. after that point a wrestler could escape the cage, and thus keep their mask or hair safe, by climbing up the side of the cage and over the top of the structure.

== Event ==
The third match of the night was a Lumberjack Strap Match, a match where other wrestlers were gathered around the ring, each given a leather strap they could use to keep the wrestlers in the ring. The match saw Los Tortugas Ninjas, literally "The Ninja Turtles", a quartet of masked wrestlers dressed up as the Teenage Mutant Ninja Turtles (called Leo, Mike, Rafy and Teelo) take on four wrestlers who did not team up on a regular basis, Avisman, Douki, Hip Hop Man and Oficial Liderk. In the end Los Tortugas Ninajs won the match and remained undefeated in IWRG.

The fourth match of the night was another chapter in a long running storyline between Los Oficiales and Los Comandos Elite, two factions with similar ring characters, police officers and SWAT team members. In the third and deciding fall Los Comandos Elite use the ring ropes to gain leverage as they pinned their opponents. As a result of the victory Los Comandos Elite were in line for a match against Chicano and Danny Casas for the IWRG Intercontinental Tag Team Championship.

For the main event La Fortaleza match the AAA representatives were clearly portraying the rudos (the "bad guys") even those that were portrayed as tecnicos (the "good guys") in AAA. The final two competitors were IWRG's Cerebro Negro and AAA's Super Fly. Moments later both Eterno (team IWRG) and Argenis (Team AAA) climbed back inside the ring to help their teammate out. In the end Super Fly managed to climb out of the cage first. As a result of the match Cerebro Negro had all his hair shaved off while standing in the middle of the ring.

== Aftermath ==
The La Fortaleza show was the last major IWRG show that focused on the IWRG vs. AAA storyline as subsequent shows such as the 2015 Guerra del Golfo show focused primarily on IWRG's own wrestlers. The Guerra del Golfo show took place only 11 days after La Fortaleza and saw X-Fly defeat Danny Casas in the main event steel cage match to force Casas to have all his hair shaved off. The match turned out to be one of Super Fly's last IWRG matches as he worked primarily for AAA as well as Lucha Underground for the remainder of 2015.

Los Comandos Elite never received their match for the IWRG Intercontinental Tag Team Championship as Chicano, co-holder of the championship along with Danny Casas ceased working for IWRG over the summer of 2015. Los Comandos Elite were not included in the tournament to determine the next champions either.

=== Results ===
| No. | Results | Stipulations |
|---|---|---|
| 1 | Alfa and Omega defeated Anubis Black and Ciclón Black | tag team match |
| 2 | Araña de Plata Jr. defeated Alas de Acero, Atomic Star, Dragón Celestial and Imposible | five-way match |
| 3 | Los Tortugas Ninjas (Leo, Mike, Rafy and Teelo) defeated Avisman, Douki, Hip Hop Man and Oficial Liderk | Lumberjack Strap Match |
| 4 | Los Comandos Elite (Oficial Rayan and Oficial Spector) defeated Los Oficiales (Oficial 911 and Oficial AK-47) | Tag Team match, #1 contenders for the IWRG Intercontinental Tag Team Championship |
| 5 | Súper Fly defeated Cerebro Negro; Also in the match: Apolo Estrada Jr., Argenis, Black Mamba, Electro Boy, Eterno, Golden Magic, Machine Rocker, El Niño Hamburguesa, Universo 2000 Jr. and Venum | La Fortaleza - 12-man Steel cage match, Lucha de Apuestas rules |
