= Siechnice =

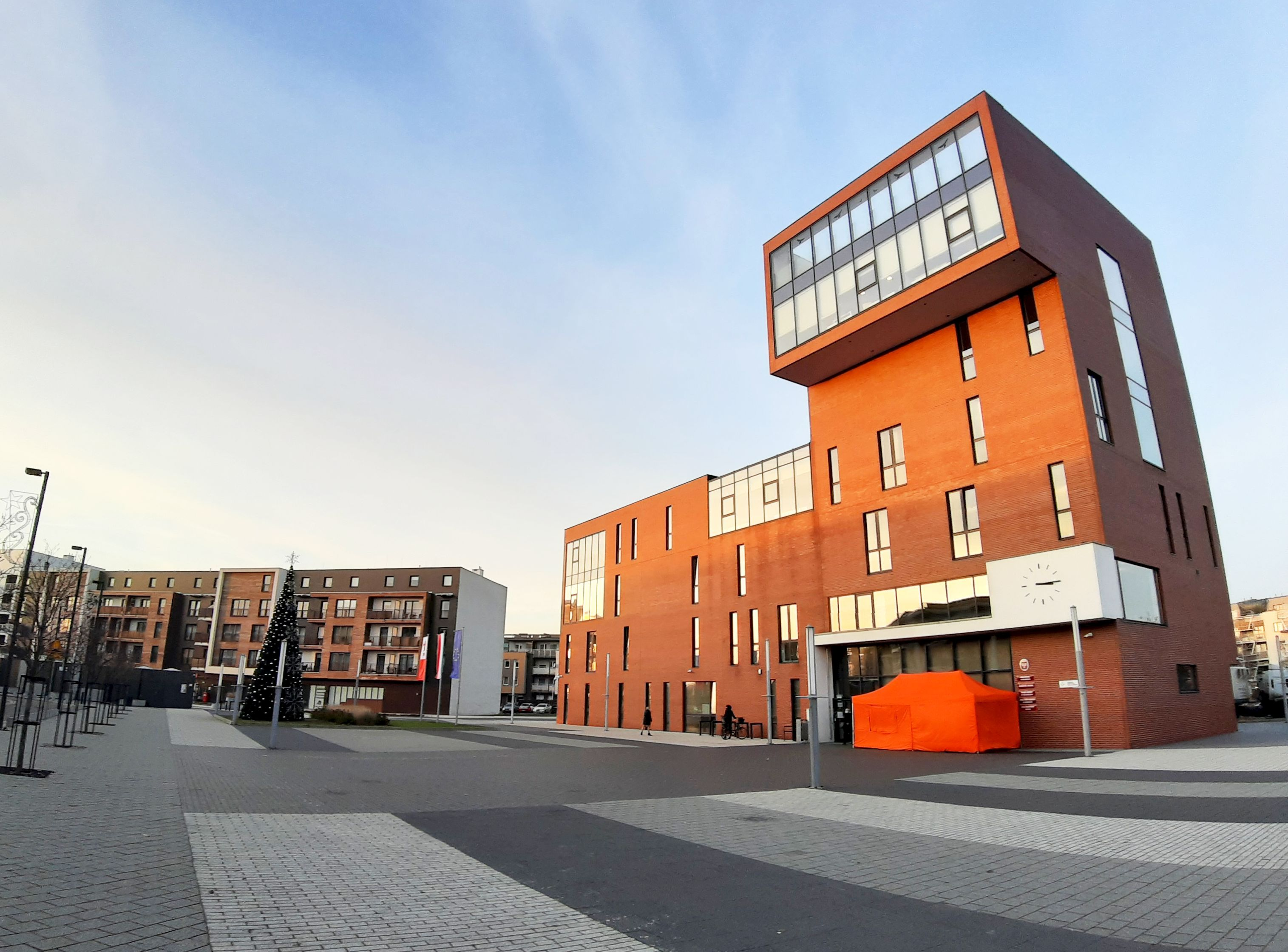

- Flag Coat of arms

- Location within Poland
- Coordinates: 51°2′12″N 17°9′9″E
- Country: Poland
- Voivodeship: Lower Silesian
- County: Wrocław
- Gmina: Siechnice
- Town rights: 1997

Government
  - Mayor: Łukasz Kropski (I)

Area
  - Total: 15.63 km^{2} (6.03 sq mi)

Population (2019-06-30)
  - Total: 8,113
  - Density: 519.1/km^{2} (1,344/sq mi)
- Time zone: UTC+1 (CET)
  - Summer (DST): UTC+2 (CEST)
- Area code: (+48) 71
- Vehicle registration: DWR
- Website: http://siechnice.com.pl/

Siechnice (Polish pronunciation: [ɕɛxˈnit͡sɛ], German: Tschechnitz, [ˈt͡ʃɛçnɪt͡s]) is a town in Wrocław County, Lower Silesian Voivodeship, in south-western Poland. It is the seat of the gmina (administrative district) of Gmina Siechnice. It gained town status in 1997, and as of 2019 has a population of 8,113. Siechnice is part of the Wrocław metropolitan area. Previously the district was called Gmina Święta Katarzyna, and Siechnice was the only town in Poland which neither gave its name to the gmina in which it lay nor served as its administrative seat.

The Czechnica power plant, a part of the Wrocław power supply system, is located in Siechnice.

== History ==
The settlement was mentioned in 1253 under the Latinized name Sechenice. Between 1323 and 1810, the village was owned by the Knights of the Cross with the Red Star, whose symbol is depicted in the town's coat of arms. The village was heavily destroyed during the Thirty Years' War and the Seven Years' War. In 1909, it gained a railway connection with the Silesian capitals Breslau (Wrocław) and Oppeln (Opole).

During the Nazi era, the settlement was renamed from Tschechnitz to Kraftborn, in order to remove traces of its Polish origin. Shortly after the war it was renamed Czechnica, the name its power plant holds to this day, and later to Siechnice.

Siechnice was granted town rights on January 1, 1997.

== Transport ==
The town has a railway station which connects Siechnice with Wrocław and Jelcz-Laskowice.

== Gallery ==
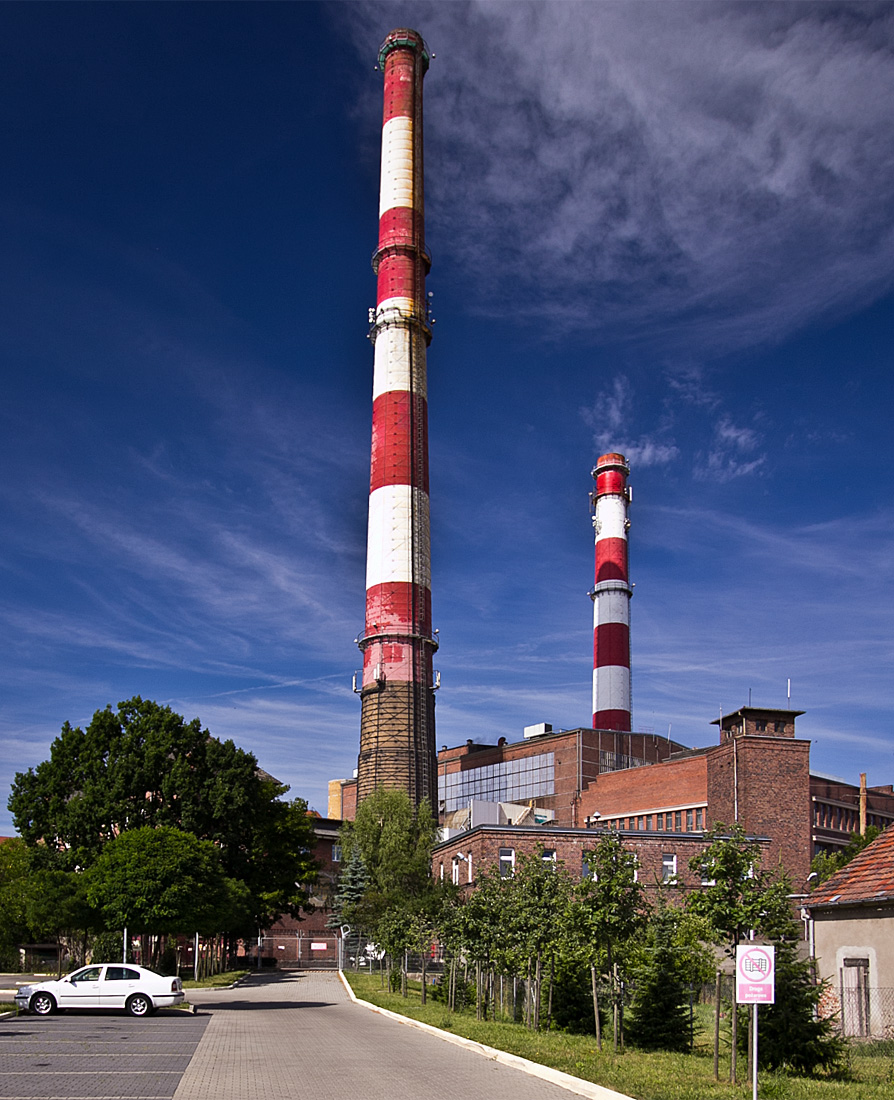
Czechnica power plant

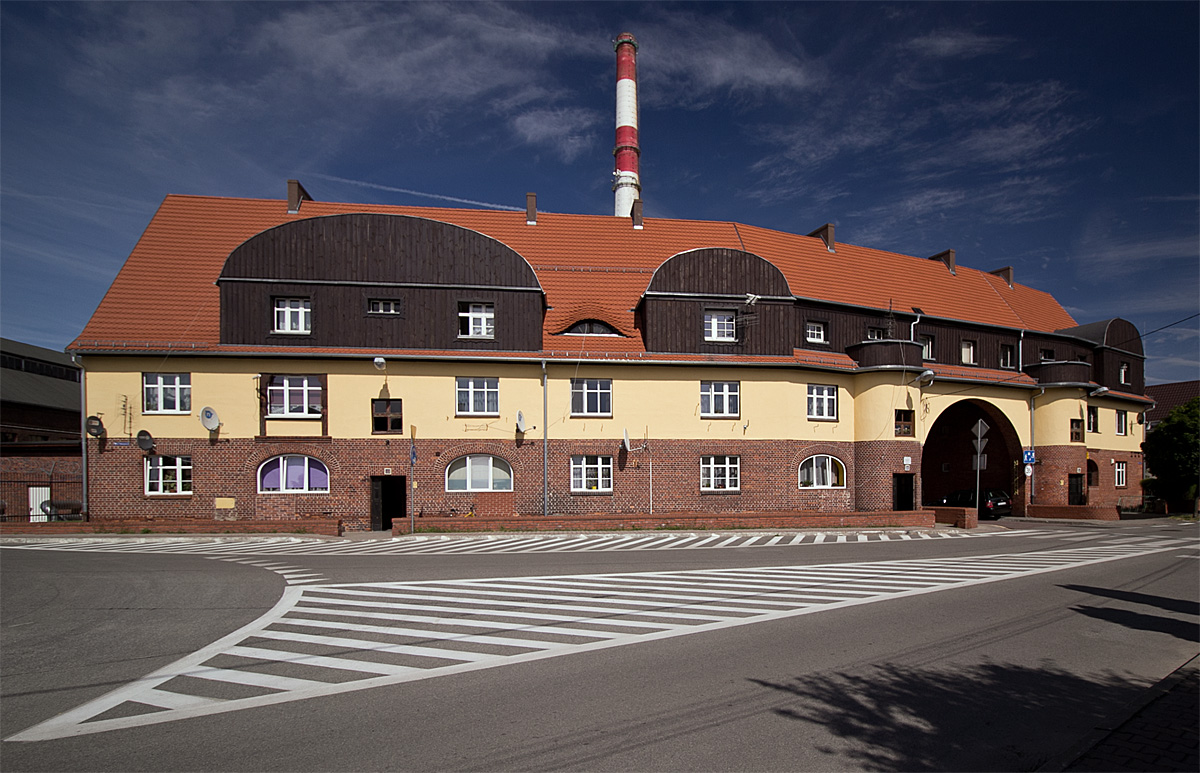
Housing for the Czechnica power plant employees

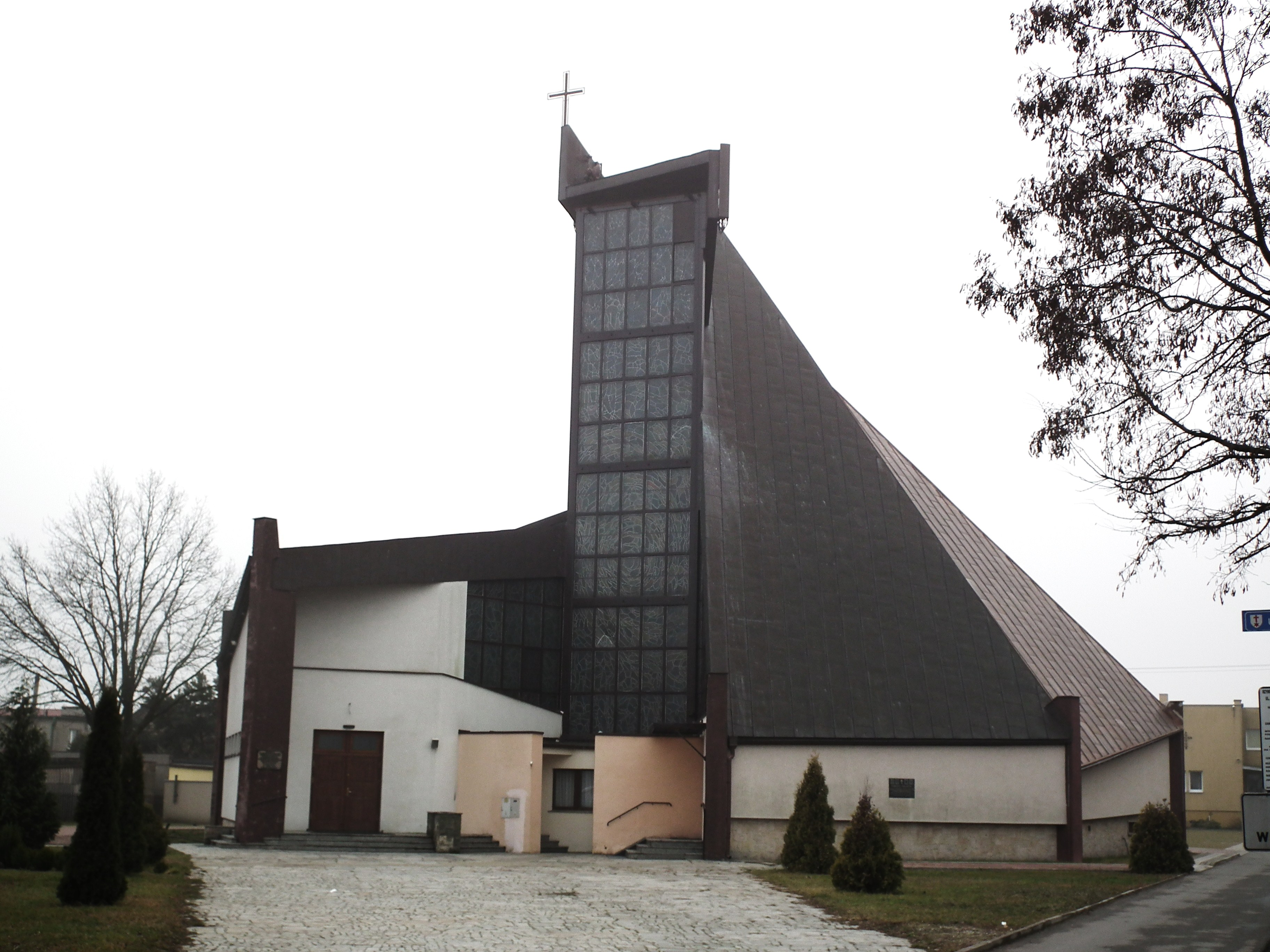
Church of the Immaculate Heart of Mary
