= Radwanice =

Radwanice may refer to the following places in Lower Silesian Voivodeship, Poland:

- Radwanice, Polkowice County
- Radwanice, Wrocław County
