= Skalmierzyce, Greater Poland Voivodeship =

Skalmierzyce
- Village
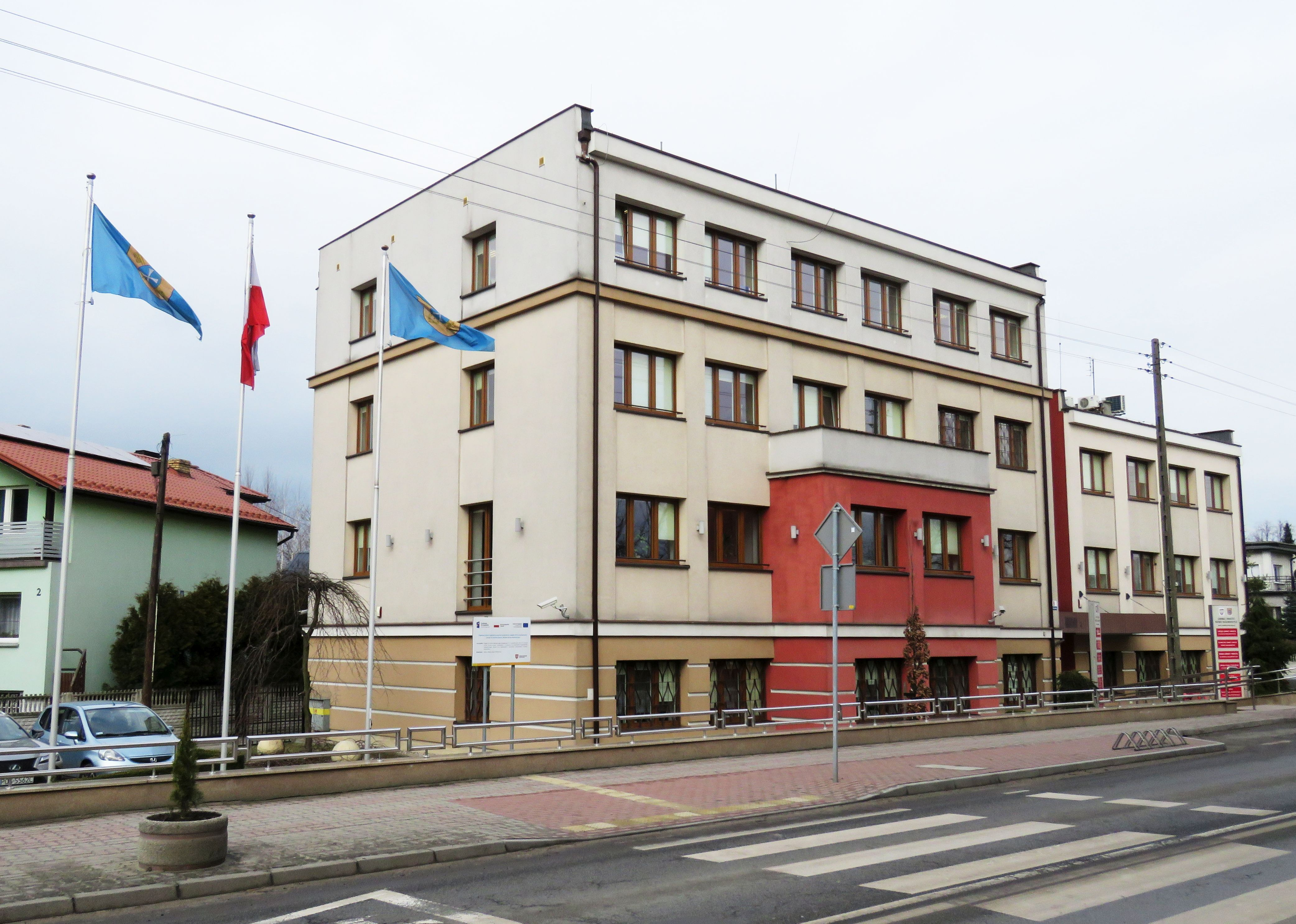
- Gmina office

- Location within Poland
- Coordinates: 51°42′N 17°58′E
- Country: Poland
- Voivodeship: Greater Poland
- County: Ostrów
- Gmina: Nowe Skalmierzyce
- Time zone: UTC+1 (CET)
  - Summer (DST): UTC+2 (CEST)
- Vehicle registration: POS
- Climate: Cfb

Skalmierzyce [skalmjɛˈʐɨt͡sɛ] is an urbanized village in Ostrów County, Greater Poland Voivodeship, in west-central Poland. It adjoins the town of Nowe Skalmierzyce.

Skalmierzyce has a population of around 4,000. It is the administrative seat of the gmina (administrative district) called Gmina Nowe Skalmierzyce. It is the only village in Poland to be the seat of a gmina containing a town (until 2009 it shared that status with Święta Katarzyna, Lower Silesian Voivodeship).

In local speech it is often called Stare Skalmierzyce ("Old Skalmierzyce"), to distinguish it from Nowe Skalmierzyce ("New Skalmierzyce").

== History ==
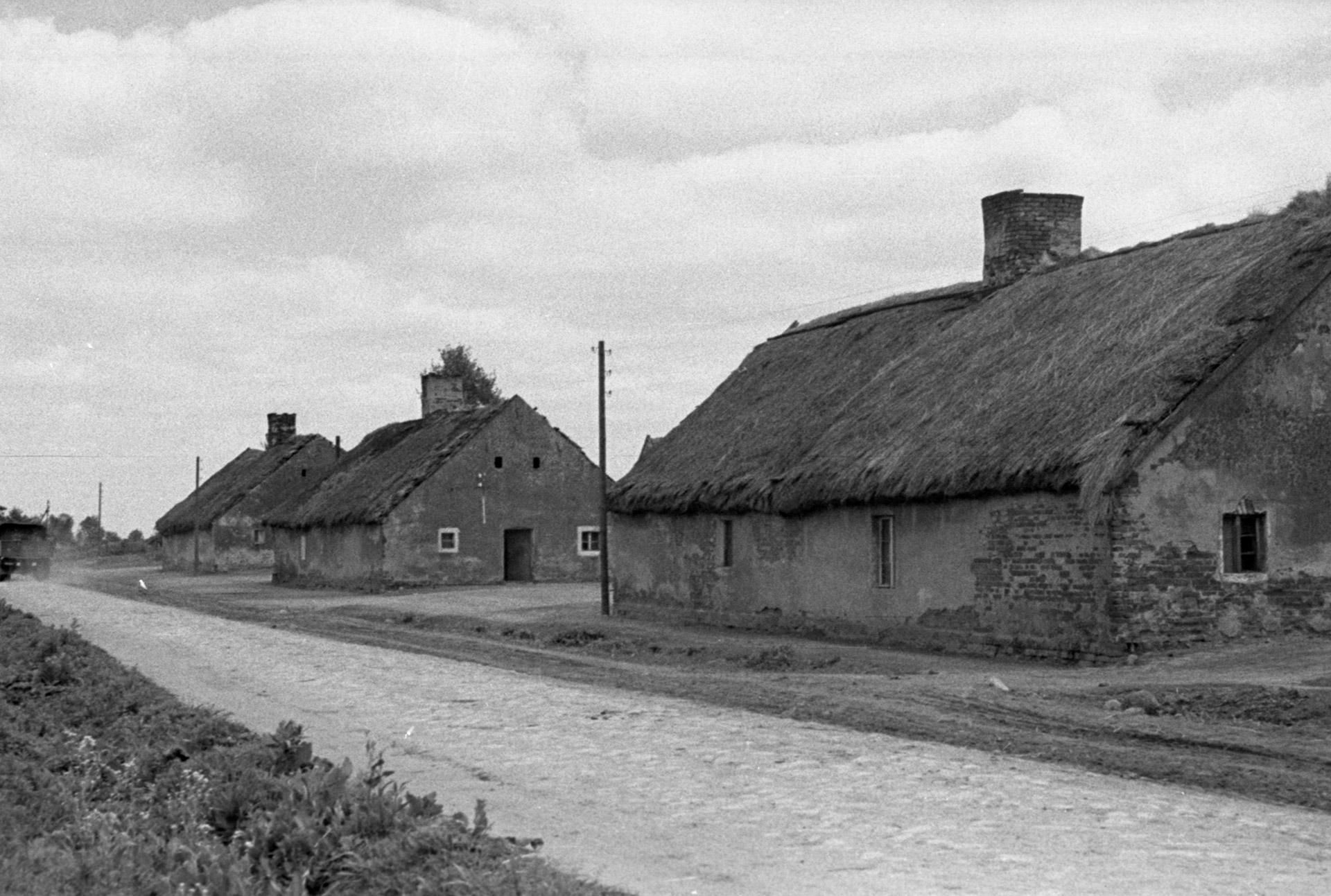
Old houses in 1959

It was originally called Scarbimirzyce, and is first mentioned in 1343. It was administratively located in the Kalisz Voivodeship in the Greater Poland Province of the Kingdom of Poland. After the Second Partition of Poland in 1793, it was annexed by the Kingdom of Prussia. Following the successful Greater Poland uprising of 1806, it was regained by Poles and included in the short-lived Polish Duchy of Warsaw. In 1815 it was re-annexed by Prussia, and found itself close to the border between Prussia and Russian-controlled Congress Poland; a customs post was set up close by, which later developed into Nowe Skalmierzyce. Following World War I, Poland regained independence and control of the settlement. According to the 1921 census, it had a population of 1,602, entirely Polish by nationality. Following the joint German-Soviet invasion of Poland, which started World War II in September 1939, the settlement was occupied by Germany until 1945.

== Sights ==
Buildings of interest include St. Catherine's church, built 1791–1792 and extended in 1873.

== Famous people born in Skalmierzyce ==
- Gunther von Hagens (born 'Gunther Liebchen', 10 January 1945), pioneering German anatomist who invented the technique for preserving biological tissue specimens called plastination.
