= Sulimów =

Sulimów may refer to the following places in Poland:

- Sulimów, Lower Silesian Voivodeship (south-west Poland)
- Sulimów, Lublin Voivodeship (east Poland)
