= Radomierzyce =

Radomierzyce may refer to the following places in Lower Silesian Voivodeship, Poland:

- Radomierzyce, Wrocław County
- Radomierzyce, Zgorzelec County
