= Shostakovich (disambiguation) =

Dmitri Shostakovich (1906–1975) was a Soviet-era Russian composer and pianist.

Shostakovich may also refer to:

== People ==
- Shostakovich (surname), a Belarusian patronymic surname also found in Eastern Poland and western Russia

== Music ==
- International Shostakovich Chamber Music Competition, a classical music contest in chamber music performance held in 2008 and 2010
- London Shostakovich Orchestra, an orchestra founded in 1999
- Saint Petersburg Academic Philharmonia Named After D. D. Shostakovich, a music society founded in 1921
- Shostakovich Quartet, a string quartet active 1966–2014

== Places ==
- Shostakovich Peninsula on southern Alexander Island, Antarctica
- 2669 Shostakovich, an 18-km-diameter minor planet

== Other uses ==
- Shostakovich (paintings), a 1969–81 series of paintings by Aubrey Williams
- Dmitri Shostakovich-class ferry, a class of ro-pax ferry built 1980–86
- Shostakovich v. Twentieth Century-Fox Film Corp., a 1948 legal case concerning copyright

== See also ==
- Alexei Shostakov
- Szostakowice
