= Mokry Dwór =

Mokry Dwór may refer to the following places in Poland:

- Mokry Dwór, Lower Silesian Voivodeship (south-west Poland)
- Mokry Dwór, Pomeranian Voivodeship (north Poland)
