= Gniazdów, Greater Poland Voivodeship =

Gniazdów
- Village
- Location within Poland
- Coordinates: 51°43′N 17°59′E
- Country: Poland
- Voivodeship: Greater Poland
- County: Ostrów
- Gmina: Nowe Skalmierzyce

Gniazdów (German 1939-1945 Langdorf) [ˈɡɲazduf] is a village in the administrative district of Gmina Nowe Skalmierzyce, within Ostrów County, Greater Poland Voivodeship, in west-central Poland.
