= Droszew =

- Village
- Location within Poland
- Coordinates: 51°45′N 17°57′E
- Country: Poland
- Voivodeship: Greater Poland
- County: Ostrów
- Gmina: Nowe Skalmierzyce

Droszew [ˈdrɔʂɛf] is a village in the administrative district of Gmina Nowe Skalmierzyce, within Ostrów County, Greater Poland Voivodeship, in west-central Poland.
