= Smardzów, Wrocław County =

Smardzów
- Village
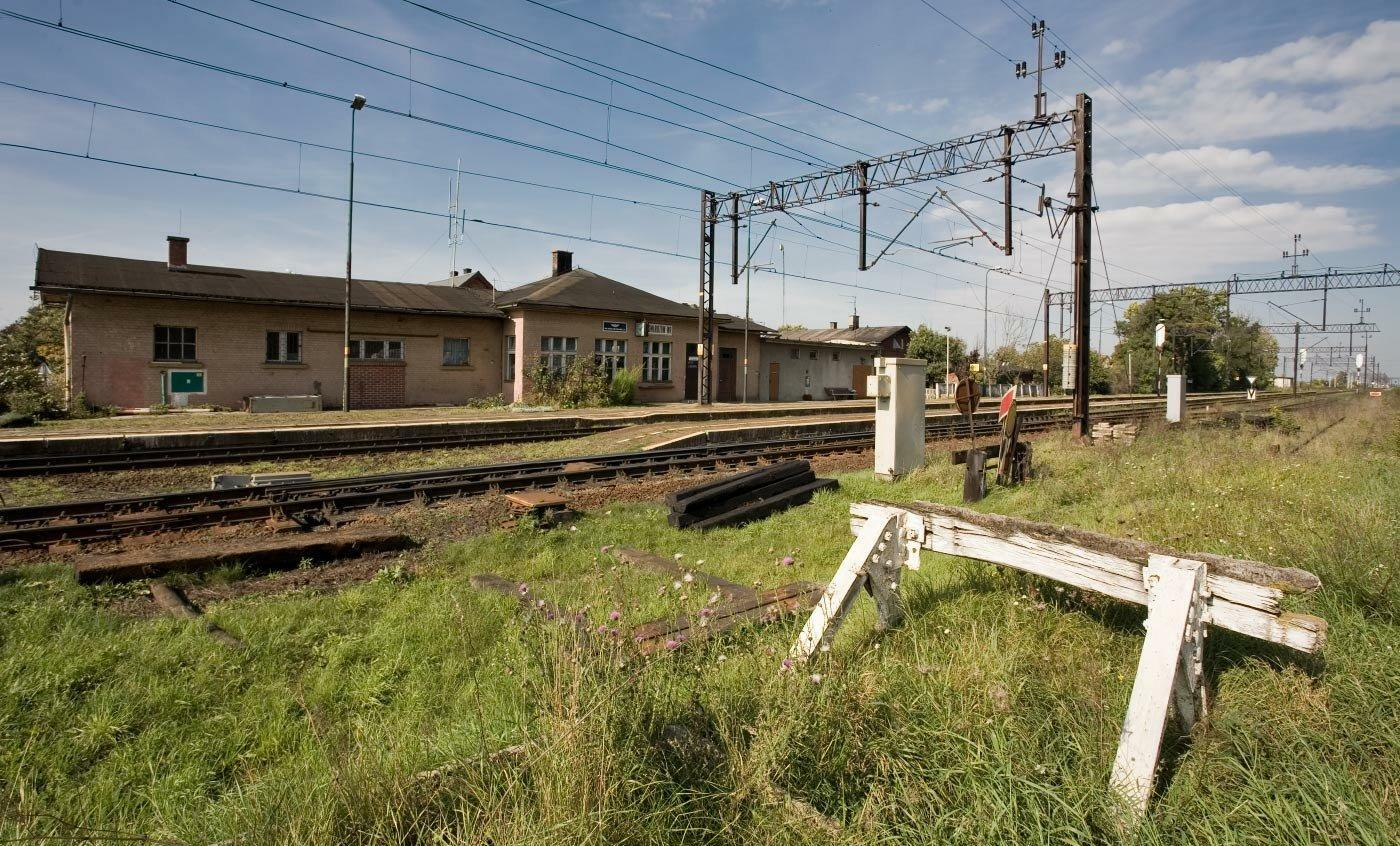
- Railway station

- Location within Poland
- Coordinates: 51°01′36″N 17°05′07″E
- Country: Poland
- Voivodeship: Lower Silesian
- County: Wrocław
- Gmina: Siechnice
- Population: 200
- Time zone: UTC+1 (CET)
  - Summer (DST): UTC+2 (CEST)
- Vehicle registration: DWR

Smardzów [ˈsmard͡zuf] is a village in the administrative district of Gmina Siechnice, within Wrocław County, Lower Silesian Voivodeship, in south-western Poland.
