= Łukaszowice =

- Village
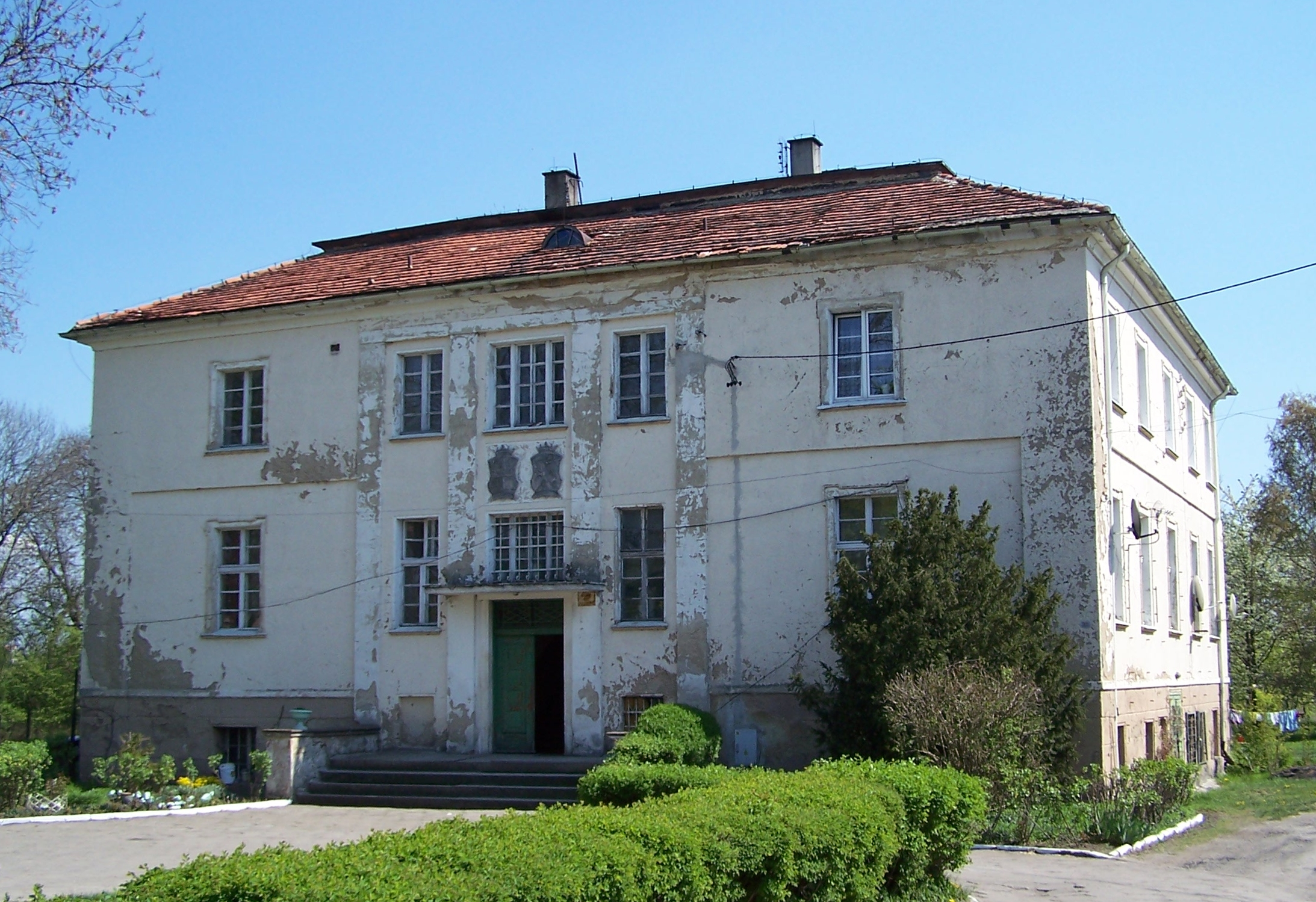
- Manor in the village

- Location within Poland
- Coordinates: 51°00′40″N 17°05′11″E
- Country: Poland
- Voivodeship: Lower Silesian
- County: Wrocław
- Gmina: Siechnice

Population
  - Total: 210

Łukaszowice [wukaʂɔˈvit͡sɛ] is a village in the administrative district of Gmina Siechnice, within Wrocław County, Lower Silesian Voivodeship, in south-western Poland.
