= Biskupice Ołoboczne =

- Village
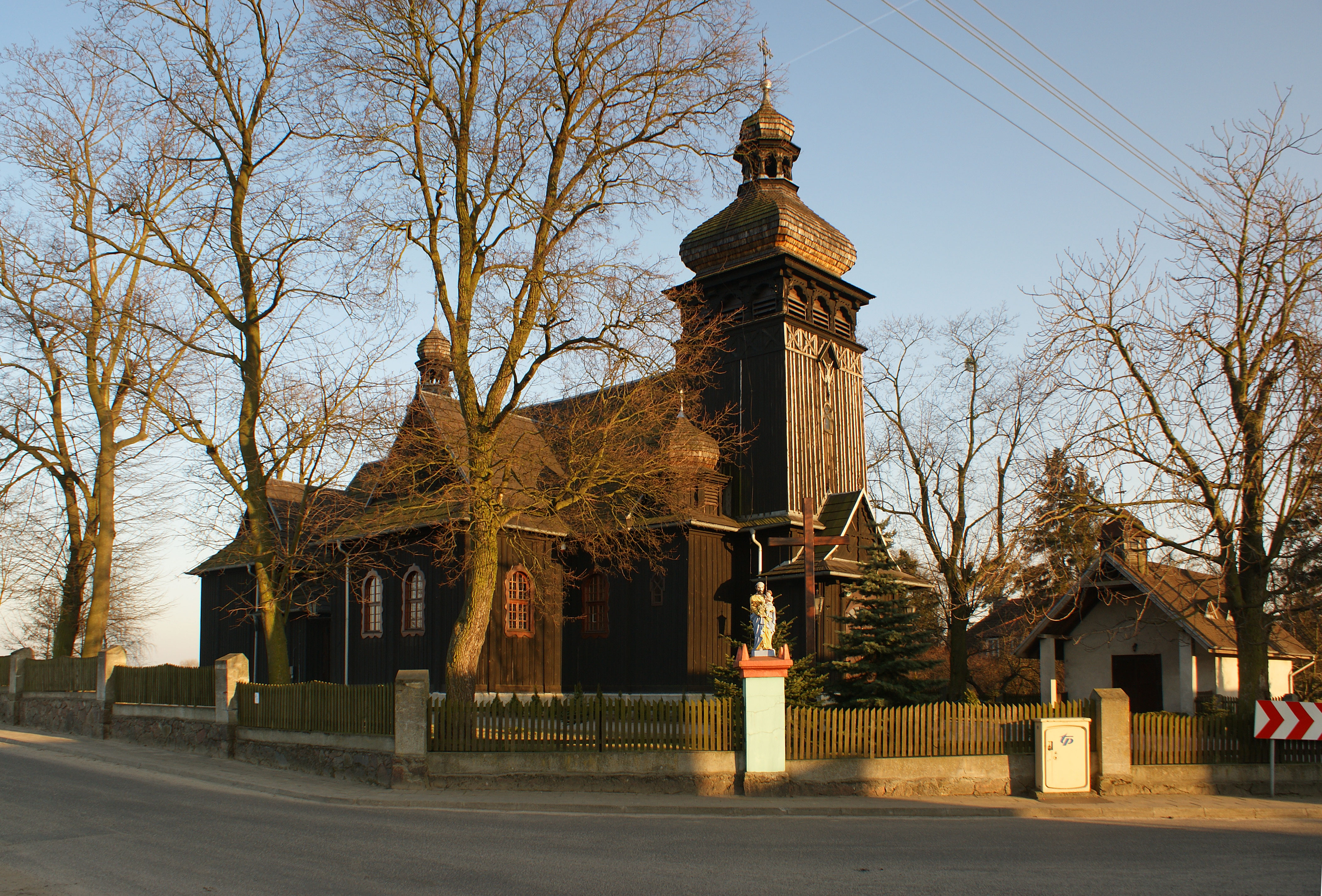
- Saint Bartholomew church in Biskupice Ołoboczne

- Location within Poland
- Coordinates: 51°41′N 17°56′E
- Country: Poland
- Voivodeship: Greater Poland
- County: Ostrów
- Gmina: Nowe Skalmierzyce

Population
  - Total: 1,500
- Time zone: UTC+1 (CET)
  - Summer (DST): UTC+2 (CEST)

Biskupice Ołoboczne [biskuˈpit͡sɛ ɔwɔˈbɔt͡ʂnɛ] is a village in the administrative district of Gmina Nowe Skalmierzyce, within Ostrów County, Greater Poland Voivodeship, in central Poland.
