= Boczków =

- Village
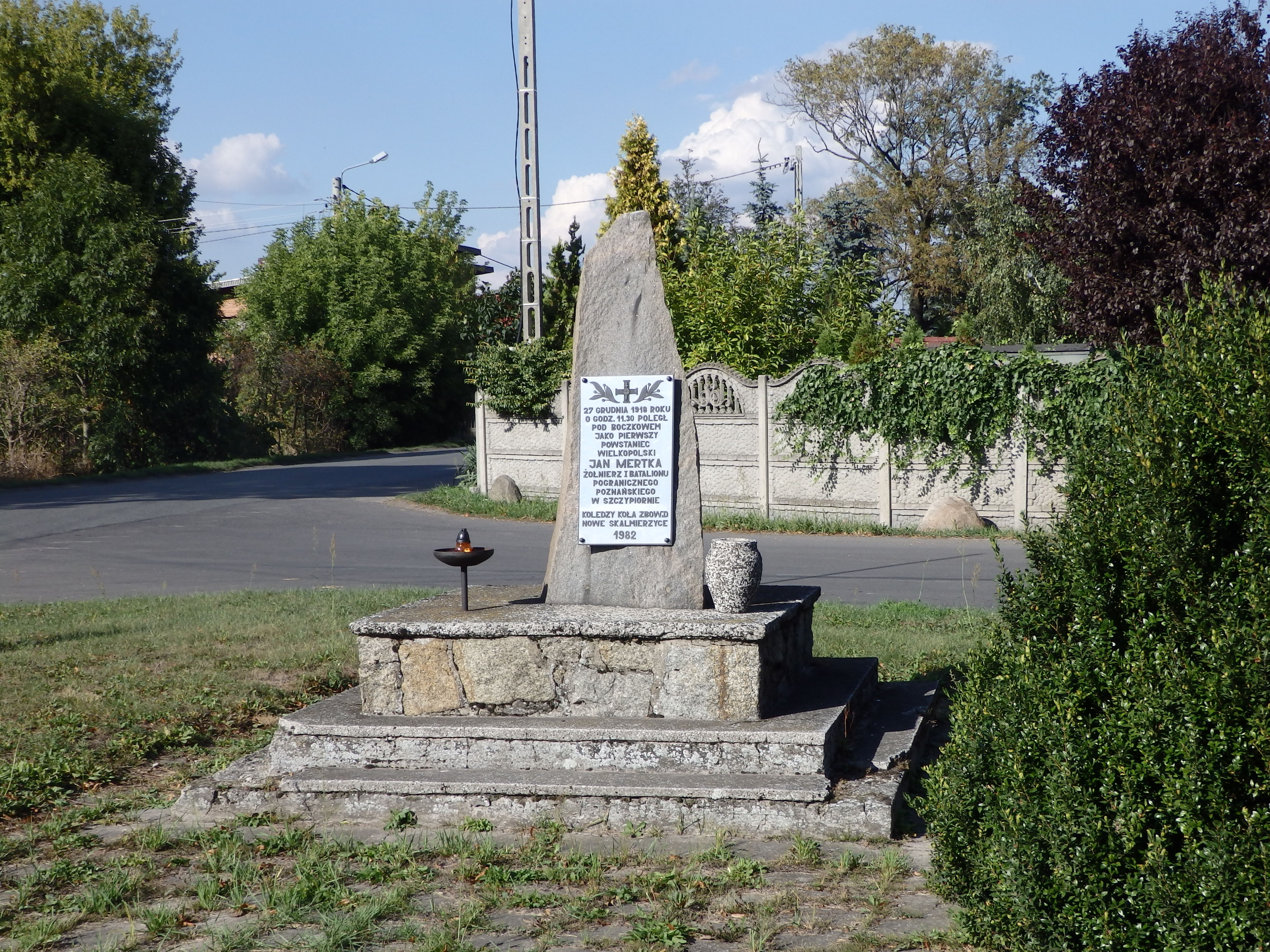
- Jan Mertka monument in Boczków

- Location within Poland
- Coordinates: 51°44′N 18°0′E
- Country: Poland
- Voivodeship: Greater Poland
- County: Ostrów
- Gmina: Nowe Skalmierzyce
- Elevation: 135 m (443 ft)
- Population: 400
- Time zone: UTC+1 (CET)
  - Summer (DST): UTC+2 (CEST)

Boczków (German 1939-1945 Maternhof) [ˈbɔt͡ʂkuf] is a village in the administrative district of Gmina Nowe Skalmierzyce, within Ostrów County, Greater Poland Voivodeship, in west-central Poland.

The village dates back to the Late Middle Ages. It was part of the Kingdom of Poland until the late-18th century Partitions of Poland, when it was annexed by Prussia. On December 27, 1918, Jan Mertka was killed in Boczków as the first fallen participant of the Greater Poland Uprising, aimed at reuniting the region with the just re-established Polish state. In response, the Polish insurgents captured the village, which became the first fully liberated village of the region during the uprising. There is a monument dedicated to Jan Mertka in Boczków. He is buried in Ostrów Wielkopolski.
