= Pawłów, Gmina Nowe Skalmierzyce =

Pawłów
- Village
- Location within Poland
- Coordinates: 51°45′53″N 17°55′19″E
- Country: Poland
- Voivodeship: Greater Poland
- County: Ostrów
- Gmina: Nowe Skalmierzyce

Pawłów [ˈpavwuf] is a village in the administrative district of Gmina Nowe Skalmierzyce, within Ostrów County, Greater Poland Voivodeship, in west-central Poland.
