= Śliwniki, Greater Poland Voivodeship =

Śliwniki
- Village
- Location within Poland
- Coordinates: 51°42′N 18°1′E
- Country: Poland
- Voivodeship: Greater Poland
- County: Ostrów
- Gmina: Nowe Skalmierzyce

Śliwniki [ɕlivˈniki] is a village in the administrative district of Gmina Nowe Skalmierzyce, within Ostrów County, Greater Poland Voivodeship, in west-central Poland.
