= Żakowice, Greater Poland Voivodeship =

Żakowice
- Village
- Location within Poland
- Coordinates: 51°46′32″N 17°57′46″E
- Country: Poland
- Voivodeship: Greater Poland
- County: Ostrów
- Gmina: Nowe Skalmierzyce
- Population: 90

Żakowice [ʐakɔˈvit͡sɛ] is a village in the administrative district of Gmina Nowe Skalmierzyce, within Ostrów County, Greater Poland Voivodeship, in west-central Poland.
