= Gałązki Wielkie =

- Village
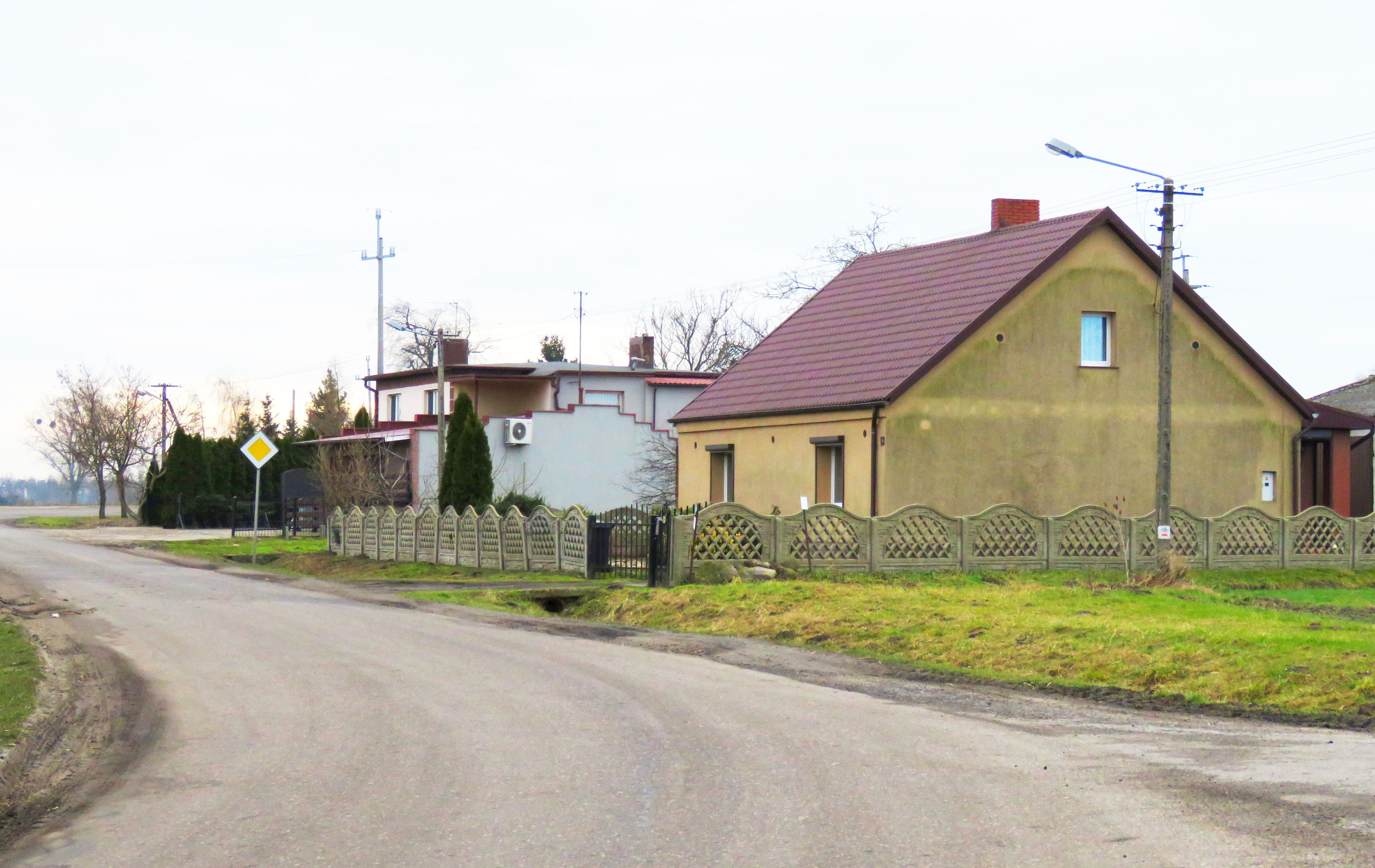

- Location within Poland
- Coordinates: 51°46′N 17°54′E
- Country: Poland
- Voivodeship: Greater Poland
- County: Ostrów
- Gmina: Nowe Skalmierzyce

Gałązki Wielkie [ɡaˈwɔ̃ski ˈvjɛlkʲɛ] is a village in the administrative district of Gmina Nowe Skalmierzyce, within Ostrów County, Greater Poland Voivodeship, in west-central Poland.
