= Pawłówek, Gmina Nowe Skalmierzyce =

Pawłówek
- Village
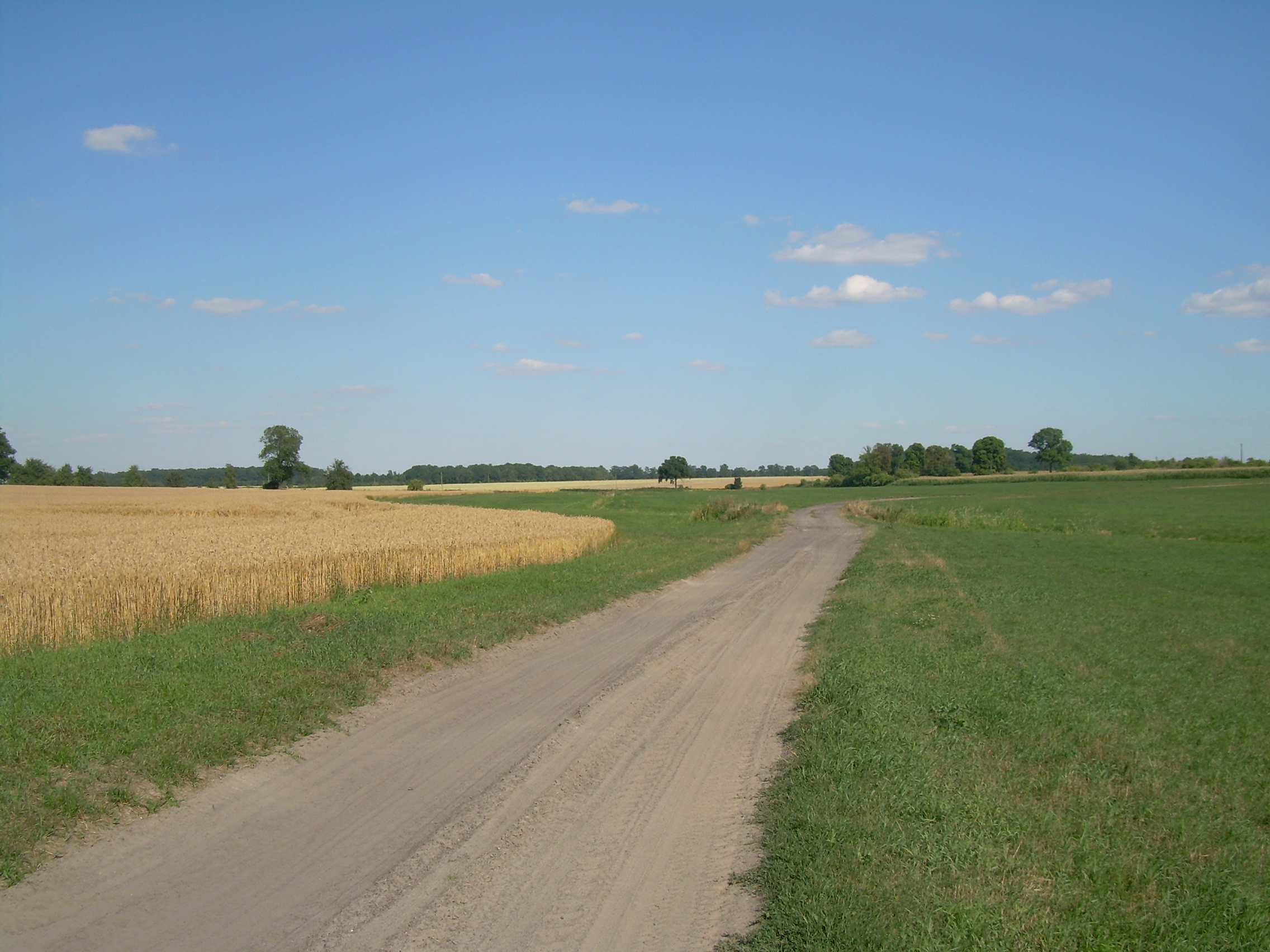
- Fields in Pawłówe

- Location within Poland
- Coordinates: 51°47′47″N 18°04′32″E
- Country: Poland
- Voivodeship: Greater Poland
- County: Ostrów
- Gmina: Nowe Skalmierzyce

Pawłówek [paˈvwuvɛk] is a village in the administrative district of Gmina Nowe Skalmierzyce, within Ostrów County, Greater Poland Voivodeship, in west-central Poland.
