= Leziona =

- Village
- Location within Poland
- Coordinates: 51°40′N 18°4′E
- Country: Poland
- Voivodeship: Greater Poland
- County: Ostrów
- Gmina: Nowe Skalmierzyce
- Population: 371

Leziona [lɛˈʑɔna] is a village in the administrative district of Gmina Nowe Skalmierzyce, within Ostrów County, Greater Poland Voivodeship, in west-central Poland.

The village has an approximate population of 600.
