= Blizanowice =

- Village
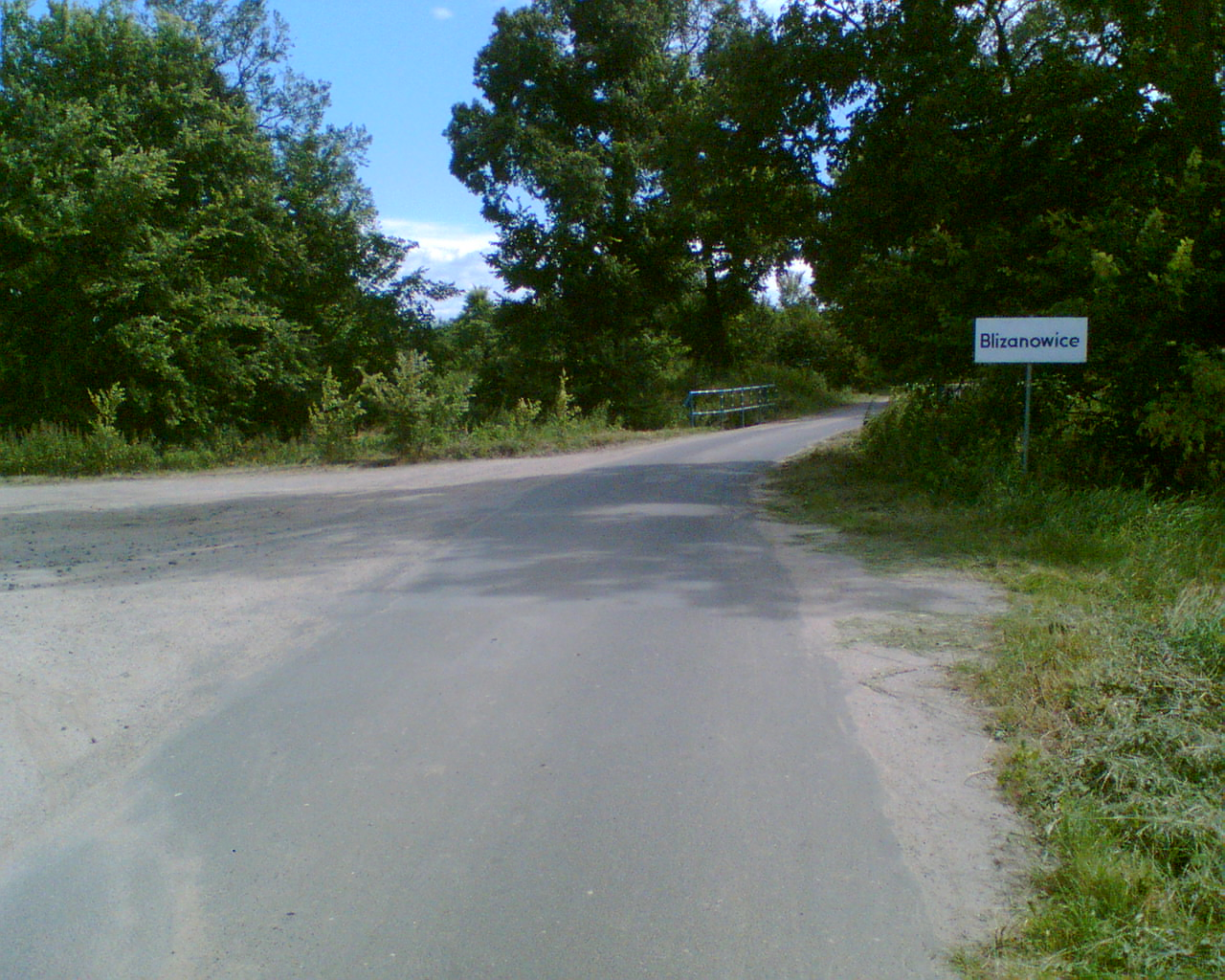

- Location within Poland
- Coordinates: 51°4′6″N 17°9′17″E
- Country: Poland
- Voivodeship: Lower Silesian
- County: Wrocław
- Gmina: Siechnice
- Population (2023): 141
  - Main settlement: 48
  - Trestno: 93

Blizanowice (Polish pronunciation: [blizanɔˈvit͡sɛ], German: Pleischwitz, [ˈplaɪ̯ʃvɪt͡s]) is a village in the administrative district of Gmina Siechnice, within Wrocław County, Lower Silesian Voivodeship, in south-western Poland.

The village is divided into two parts, the eastern main part and the western part called Trestno.

As of 2024, the village had 48 permanent residents.
