= Biskupice, Gmina Nowe Skalmierzyce =

Biskupice
- Village
- Location within Poland
- Coordinates: 51°45′N 18°0′E
- Country: Poland
- Voivodeship: Greater Poland
- County: Ostrów
- Gmina: Nowe Skalmierzyce

Biskupice [biskuˈpit͡sɛ] is a village in the administrative district of Gmina Nowe Skalmierzyce, within Ostrów County, Greater Poland Voivodeship, in west-central Poland.
