= Fabianów, Gmina Nowe Skalmierzyce =

Fabianów
- Village
- Location within Poland
- Coordinates: 51°42′N 17°55′E
- Country: Poland
- Voivodeship: Greater Poland
- County: Ostrów
- Gmina: Nowe Skalmierzyce
- Population (approx.): 650

Fabianów [faˈbjanuf] is a village in the administrative district of Gmina Nowe Skalmierzyce, within Ostrów County, Greater Poland Voivodeship, in west-central Poland.

The village has an approximate population of 650.
