= Bogusławice, Wrocław County =

Bogusławice
- Village
- Location within Poland
- Coordinates: 50°59′48″N 17°6′5″E
- Country: Poland
- Voivodeship: Lower Silesian
- County: Wrocław
- Gmina: Siechnice

Bogusławice ([bɔɡuswaˈvit͡sɛ], German: Boguslawitz) is a village in the administrative district of Gmina Siechnice, within Wrocław County, Lower Silesian Voivodeship, in south-western Poland.
