= Chotów, Greater Poland Voivodeship =

Chotów
- Village
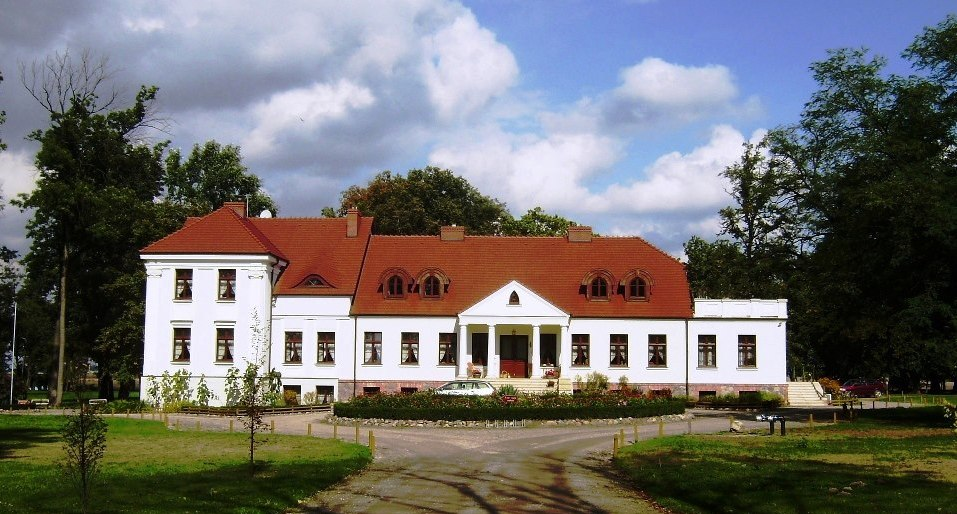

- Location within Poland
- Coordinates: 51°42′N 18°4′E
- Country: Poland
- Voivodeship: Greater Poland
- County: Ostrów
- Gmina: Nowe Skalmierzyce
- Elevation: 130 m (430 ft)
- Population: 240

Chotów [ˈxɔtuf] is a village in the administrative district of Gmina Nowe Skalmierzyce, within Ostrów County, Greater Poland Voivodeship, in west-central Poland.
