= Głóski =

- Village
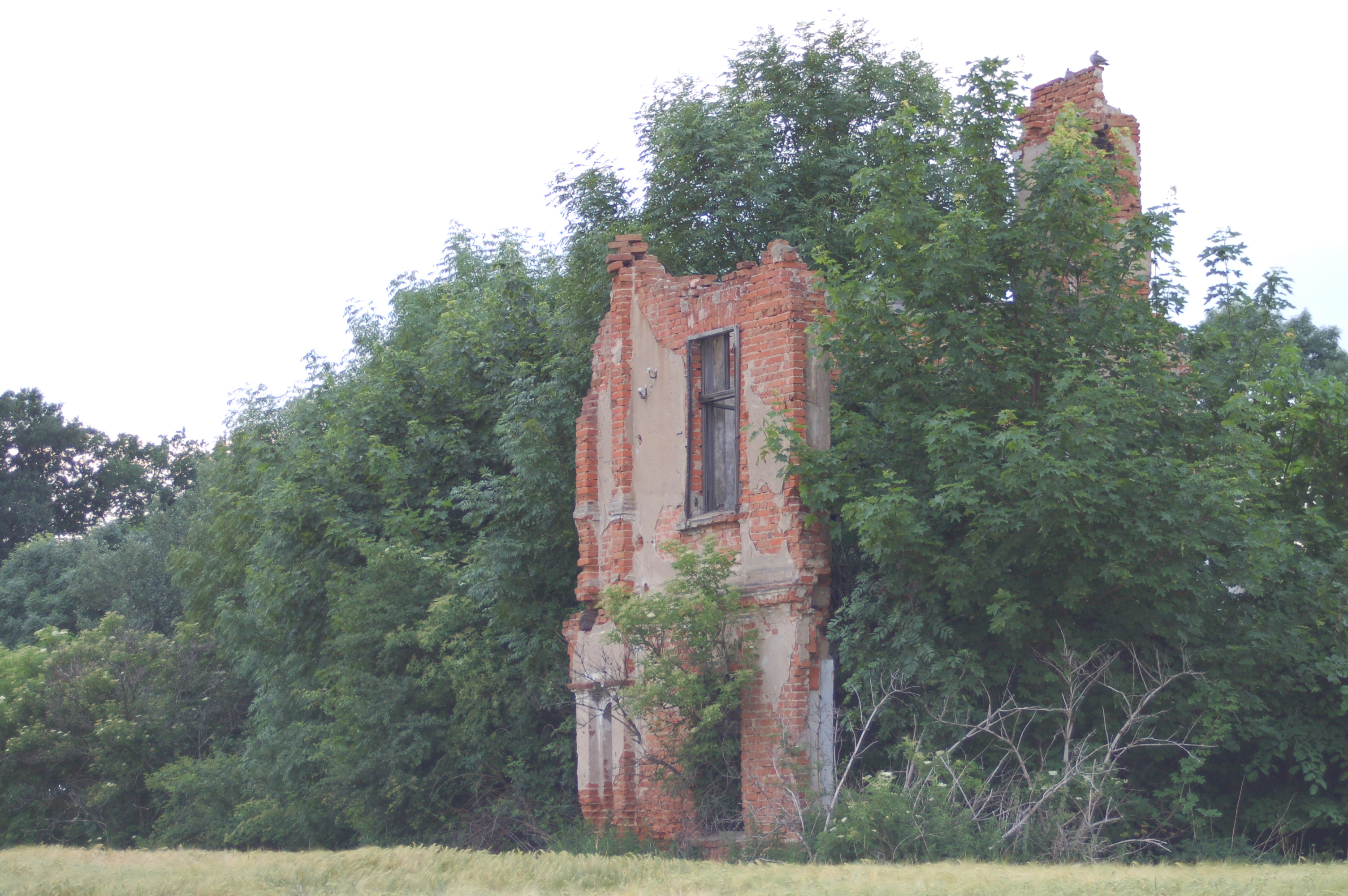
- Ruined palace in Głóski

- Location within Poland
- Coordinates: 51°46′19″N 17°58′45″E
- Country: Poland
- Voivodeship: Greater Poland
- County: Ostrów
- Gmina: Nowe Skalmierzyce

Głóski [ˈɡwuski] is a village in the administrative district of Gmina Nowe Skalmierzyce, within Ostrów County, Greater Poland Voivodeship, in west-central Poland.
