= IWRG La Jaula de la Muerte =

2011 International Wrestling Revolution Group event

- Official poster depicting all the teams in the main event
- Promotion: International Wrestling Revolution Group
- Date: August 28, 2011 (aired December 25, 2011)
- City: Naucalpan, State of Mexico
- Venue: Arena Naucalpan
- Attendance: 2,400

Event chronology
← Previous; El Gran Desafío	Next → Choque de Juniors

La Jaula de la Muerte (Spanish for "The Cage of Death") was a special professional wrestling event produced by the International Wrestling Revolution Group (IWRG), that took place on August 28, 2011, at Arena Naucalpan in Naucalpan, State of Mexico. The focal point of the show and the inspiration for the event name was the main event steel cage match between four trios teams with each group "betting" something on the outcome of the match. Under the rules of the match the last wrestler in the cage would be deemed the loser along with his partners, losing their "bet", while the second to last person in the ring would be declared the winners of the same bet. Los Psycho Circus (Monster Clown, Murder Clown and Psycho Clown) placed their IWRG Intercontinental Trios Championship on the line. The remaining groups all placed their wrestling mask or hair on the line and would either unmask or be shaved bald if their team lost. The last three teams were; Los Perros del Mal (Bestia 666, Damián 666 and X-Fly), Los Villanos (Kortiz, Ray Mendoza, Jr. and Villano IV) and Los Nuevo Temerarios (Black Terry, Durok, Machín). Some of the matches were taped for televisiona and shown on TVC Deportes on December 25, 2011.

== Background ==
The event featured five professional wrestling matches with different wrestlers, where some were involved in pre-existing scripted feuds or storylines and others simply put together by the matchmakers without a backstory. Being a professional wrestling event matches are not won legitimately through athletic competition; they are instead won via predetermined outcomes to the matches that is kept secret from the general public. Wrestlers portray either heels (the bad guys, referred to as Rudos in Mexico) or faces (fan favorites or Técnicos in Mexico).

== Results ==
#	Result	Stipulation	Reference
1	Dragon Fly and Tritón defeated Alan Extreme and Demente	Best two-out-of-three falls tag team match	
2	Los Astros (Astro de Plata and Astro Rey, Jr. defeated Carta Brava, Jr. and Picudo, Jr.	Best two-out-of-three falls tag team match	
3	Apolo Estrada, Jr., Avisman and El Hijo del Diablo defeated Centvrión, Hammer and Multifacético	Best two out of three falls six-man tag team match	
4	Decnnis, Súper Fly and Tito Santana defeated Dinamic Black, Golden Magic and Veneno by disqualification	Lumberjacks with leather straps match	
5	Los Perros del Mal (Bestia 666, Damián 666 and X-Fly) defeated Los Psycho Circus (Monster Clown, Murder Clown and Psycho Clown) (C) in a match that also included Los Villanos (Kortiz, Ray Mendoza, Jr. and Villano IV) and Los Nuevo Temerarios (Black Terry, Durok, Machín)	La Jaula de la Muerte, IWRG Intercontinental Trios Championship vs. masks vs. hairs steel cage match	
(C) Refers to the champion going into the match

== Aftermath ==
Los Perros del Mal held the Intercontinental Trios Championship until December 1, 2011, a total of six days before losing the belts to Los Junior Dinamitas (Cien Caras, Jr., El Hijo de Máscara Año 2000 and Máscara Año 2000, Jr.) In the weeks following the title loss all three Perros del Mal representatives left the group and formed a new group called La Familia de Tijuana.
