= Kotowiecko =

- Village
- Location within Poland
- Coordinates: 51°46′N 17°57′E
- Country: Poland
- Voivodeship: Greater Poland
- County: Ostrów
- Gmina: Nowe Skalmierzyce
- Population (approx.): 700

Kotowiecko [kɔtɔˈvjɛt͡skɔ] (German 1939-1945 Lekow / Katen) is a village in the administrative district of Gmina Nowe Skalmierzyce, within Ostrów County, Greater Poland Voivodeship, in west-central Poland.

The village has an approximate population of 700.
