= Kościuszków, Greater Poland Voivodeship =

Kościuszków
- Village
- Location within Poland
- Coordinates: 51°43′35″N 17°56′13″E
- Country: Poland
- Voivodeship: Greater Poland
- County: Ostrów
- Gmina: Nowe Skalmierzyce
- Population: 60

Kościuszków [kɔɕˈt͡ɕuʂkuf] is a village in the administrative district of Gmina Nowe Skalmierzyce, within Ostrów County, Greater Poland Voivodeship, in west-central Poland.
