= Strzegowa, Greater Poland Voivodeship =

Strzegowa
- Village
- Location within Poland
- Coordinates: 51°40′N 18°3′E
- Country: Poland
- Voivodeship: Greater Poland
- County: Ostrów
- Gmina: Nowe Skalmierzyce

Strzegowa [stʂɛˈɡɔva] is a village in the administrative district of Gmina Nowe Skalmierzyce, within Ostrów County, Greater Poland Voivodeship, in west-central Poland.
