= Gmina Nowe Skalmierzyce =

Gmina Nowe Skalmierzyce Nowe Skalmierzyce Commune
- Gmina
- Coat of arms
- Interactive map of Gmina Nowe Skalmierzyce
- Coordinates (Skalmierzyce): 51°42′N 17°58′E
- Country: Poland
- Voivodeship: Greater Poland
- County: Ostrów
- Seat: Skalmierzyce

Area
  - Total: 125.67 km^{2} (48.52 sq mi)

Population (2017)
  - Total: 151,430
  - Density: 1,205.0/km^{2} (3,120.9/sq mi)
  - Urban: 5,080
  - Rural: 10,089
- Website: http://www.noweskalmierzyce.pl/

Gmina Nowe Skalmierzyce is an urban-rural gmina (administrative district) in Ostrów County, Greater Poland Voivodeship, in west-central Poland. In 1999 the administrative seat of the gmina was moved from the town of Nowe Skalmierzyce to the adjoining locality of Skalmierzyce, which is officially classed as a village. (This is now the only urban-rural gmina in Poland to have its seat outside the town; until 2009 it shared that status with Gmina Święta Katarzyna, now Gmina Siechnice.)

The gmina covers an area of 125.67 square kilometres (48.5 sq mi), and as of 2006 its total population is 15,169 (out of which the population of Nowe Skalmierzyce is 5,080, and the population of the remainder of the gmina is 10,089).

Skalmierzyce lies approximately 22 kilometres (14 mi) east of Ostrów Wielkopolski and 107 km (66 mi) south-east of the regional capital Poznań.

== Villages ==
Apart from Skalmierzyce and Nowe Skalmierzyce, the gmina also contains the villages and settlements of Biskupice, Biskupice Ołoboczne, Boczków, Chotów, Czachory, Droszew, Fabianów, Gałązki Małe, Gałązki Wielkie, Głóski, Gniazdów, Gostyczyna, Kościuszków, Kotowiecko, Kurów, Leziona, Mączniki, Miedzianów, Ociąż, Osiek, Pawłów, Pawłówek, Śliwniki, Śmiłów, Strzegowa, Trkusów, Węgry and Żakowice.

== Neighbouring gminas ==
Gmina Nowe Skalmierzyce is bordered by the city of Kalisz and by the gminas of Godziesze Wielkie, Gołuchów, Ostrów Wielkopolski and Sieroszewice.
