= Ozorzyce =

- Village
- Location within Poland
- Coordinates: 50°59′57″N 17°04′54″E
- Country: Poland
- Voivodeship: Lower Silesian
- County: Wrocław
- Gmina: Siechnice

Ozorzyce [ɔzɔˈʐɨt͡sɛ] is a village in the administrative district of Gmina Siechnice, within Wrocław County, Lower Silesian Voivodeship, in south-western Poland.
