= Węgry, Greater Poland Voivodeship =

Węgry
- Village
- Location within Poland
- Coordinates: 51°40′N 18°2′E
- Country: Poland
- Voivodeship: Greater Poland
- County: Ostrów
- Gmina: Nowe Skalmierzyce

Węgry [ˈvɛnɡrɨ] is a village in the administrative district of Gmina Nowe Skalmierzyce, within Ostrów County, Greater Poland Voivodeship, in west-central Poland.
