= Ociąż =

- Village
- Location within Poland
- Coordinates: 51°43′N 17°56′E
- Country: Poland
- Voivodeship: Greater Poland
- County: Ostrów
- Gmina: Nowe Skalmierzyce
- Population: 1,000

Ociąż [ˈɔt͡ɕɔ̃ʂ] is a village in the administrative district of Gmina Nowe Skalmierzyce, within Ostrów County, Greater Poland Voivodeship, in west-central Poland.
