= Nowe Skalmierzyce =

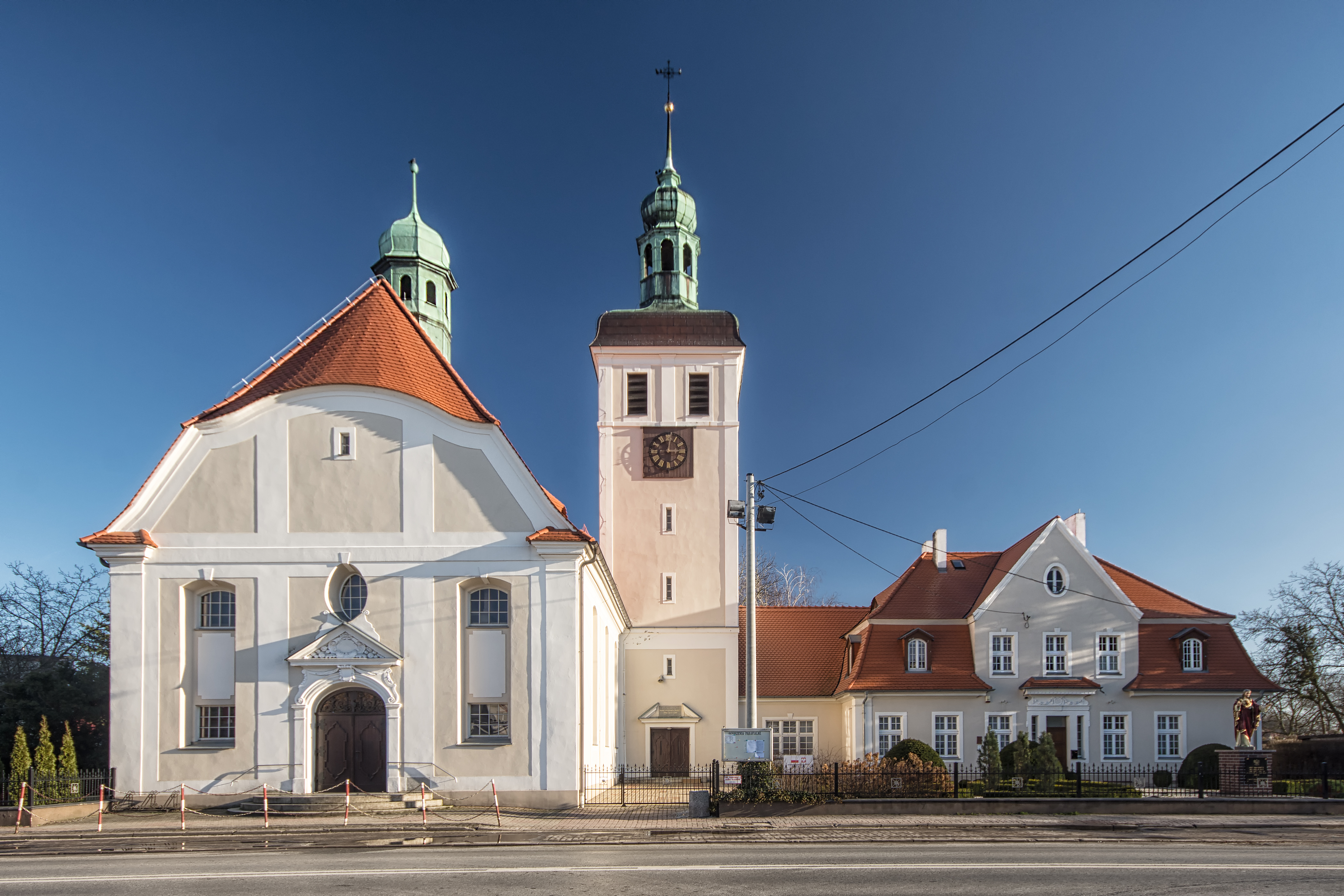
- Our Lady of Perpetual Help church in Nowe Skalmierzyce

- Flag Coat of arms

- Location within Poland
- Coordinates: 51°43′N 18°0′E
- Country: Poland
- Voivodeship: Greater Poland
- County: Ostrów
- Gmina: Nowe Skalmierzyce

Area
  - Total: 1.59 km^{2} (0.61 sq mi)

Population (2006)
  - Total: 5,080
  - Density: 3,190/km^{2} (8,270/sq mi)
- Time zone: UTC+1 (CET)
  - Summer (DST): UTC+2 (CEST)
- Postal code: 63-460
- Vehicle registration: POS
- Climate: Cfb
- Website: http://www.noweskalmierzyce.pl/

Nowe Skalmierzyce [ˈnɔvɛ skalmʲɛˈʐɨt͡sɛ] is a town and its surrounding municipality in Ostrów County, Greater Poland Voivodeship, in central Poland. The town has a population of 5,093 (2006 est.), while the municipality, Gmina Nowe Skalmierzyce, which is a mixed urban-rural gmina that includes the town, has a population of 15,191. The town has a land area of only 1.58 km², which results in a population density of 3,223.4 persons/km², the seventh-highest density of all towns in Poland, and the second-highest density (after Swarzędz) of the urban portion of any Polish urban-rural gmina (gmina miejsko-wiejska). The gmina has a land area of 125.42 km².

Nowe Skalmierzyce ("New Skalmierzyce") adjoins the urbanized village of Skalmierzyce, which is in fact the administrative seat of the gmina.

== History ==
Nowe Skalmierzyce originally developed as a customs post on the border between the Prussian Partition of Poland and Russian-controlled Congress Poland in the 19th century. In 1908 it was separated from the old village of Skalmierzyce, and it remained a separate settlement since. After World War I, in November 1918, Poland regained independence, and shortly after the Greater Poland Uprising broke out, which aim was to reintegrate the region of Greater Poland with Poland. Nowe Skalmierzyce was the first settlement in the area to be liberated by Polish insurgents. Afterwards, within interwar Poland, it formed part of the Poznań Voivodeship. According to the 1921 census, the town had a population of 2,388, 98.0% Polish and 1.7% German.

During the German occupation (World War II), a transit camp for Poles expelled from the region was operated in the local school. Poles were deported from the camp either to the General Government in the more-eastern part of occupied Poland or to concentration camps. In 1943, it was renamed Kalmen by the occupiers in attempt to erase traces of Polish origin. On the night of 14–15 September 1943, a plane of the Special Operations Executive, carrying a supply of weapons and ammunition for the Home Army Polish resistance organization, crashed in the town.

Nowe Skalmierzyce was granted town rights in 1962.

== Sights ==
In the town, there are monuments commemorating the Greater Poland Uprising of 1918–1919 and the prisoners of the former Nazi German transit camp for Poles expelled from the region.

== Sports ==
The local football club is Pogoń Nowe Skalmierzyce. It competes in the lower leagues.
