= Osiek, Gmina Nowe Skalmierzyce =

Osiek
- Village
- Location within Poland
- Coordinates: 51°40′58″N 18°05′55″E
- Country: Poland
- Voivodeship: Greater Poland
- County: Ostrów
- Gmina: Nowe Skalmierzyce

Osiek [ˈɔɕɛk] is a village in the administrative district of Gmina Nowe Skalmierzyce, within Ostrów County, Greater Poland Voivodeship, in west-central Poland.
