= Mączniki, Gmina Nowe Skalmierzyce =

Mączniki
- Village
- Location within Poland
- Coordinates: 51°42′25″N 18°1′14″E
- Country: Poland
- Voivodeship: Greater Poland
- County: Ostrów
- Gmina: Nowe Skalmierzyce

Mączniki [mɔnt͡ʂˈniki] is a village in the administrative district of Gmina Nowe Skalmierzyce, within Ostrów County, Greater Poland Voivodeship, in west-central Poland.
