= Iwiny, Wrocław County =

Iwiny
- Village
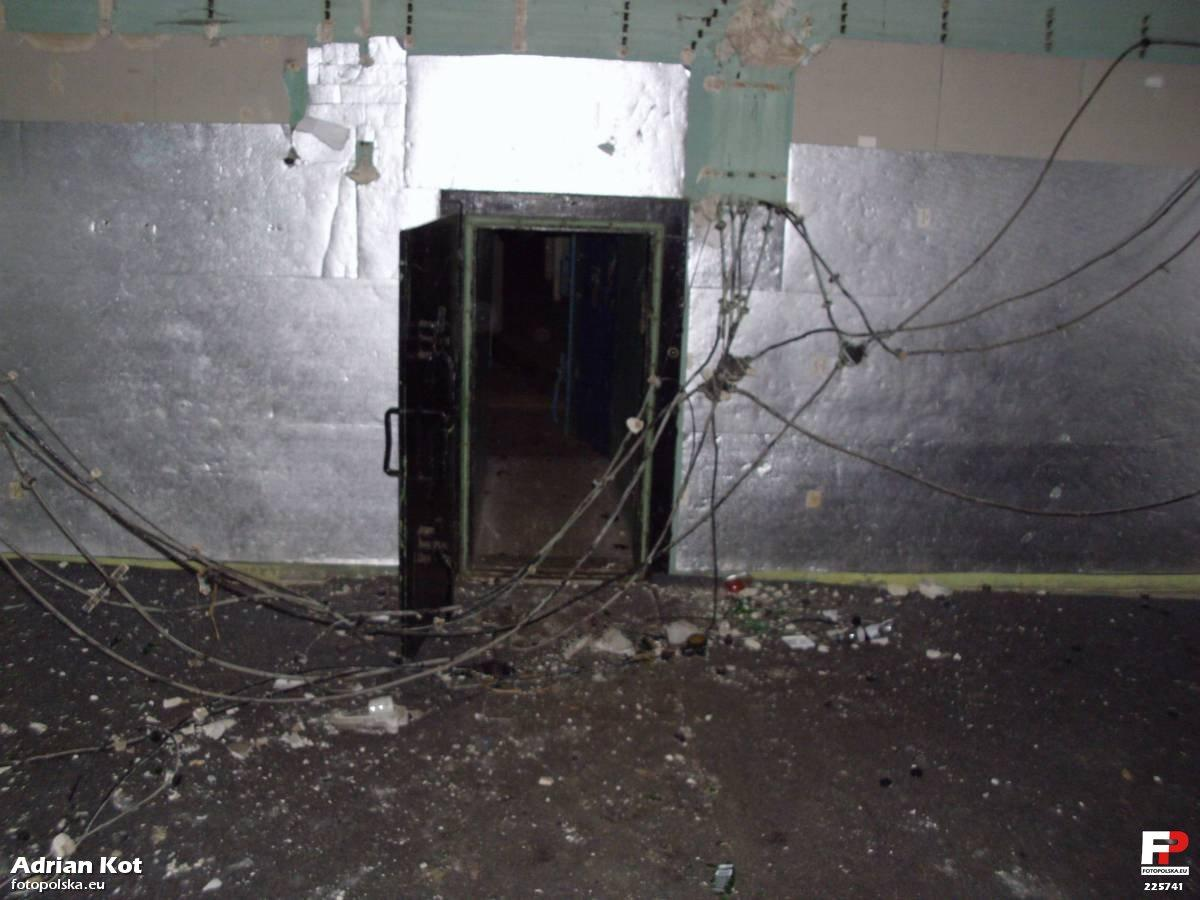
- Bunker

- Location within Poland
- Coordinates: 51°02′27″N 17°04′31″E
- Country: Poland
- Voivodeship: Lower Silesian
- County: Wrocław
- Gmina: Siechnice
- Population: 330

Iwiny [iˈvinɨ] is a village in the administrative district of Gmina Siechnice, within Wrocław County, Lower Silesian Voivodeship, in south-western Poland.
