= Śmiłów, Greater Poland Voivodeship =

Śmiłów
- Village
- Location within Poland
- Coordinates: 51°40′N 18°5′E
- Country: Poland
- Voivodeship: Greater Poland
- County: Ostrów
- Gmina: Nowe Skalmierzyce

Śmiłów [ˈɕmiwuf] is a village in the administrative district of Gmina Nowe Skalmierzyce, within Ostrów County, Greater Poland Voivodeship, in west-central Poland.
