= Zacharzyce =

- Village
- Location within Poland
- Coordinates: 51°02′19″N 17°06′08″E
- Country: Poland
- Voivodeship: Lower Silesian
- County: Wrocław
- Gmina: Siechnice
- Population: 118

Zacharzyce (Polish pronunciation: [zaxaˈʐɨt͡sɛ], German: Sacherwitz, (Note: In 1937–1945, during the Nazi era, renamed to Sachern.) [ˈzaχɐvɪt͡s]) is a village in the administrative district of Gmina Siechnice, within Wrocław County, Lower Silesian Voivodeship, in south-western Poland.
