= Radomierzyce, Wrocław County =

Radomierzyce
- Village
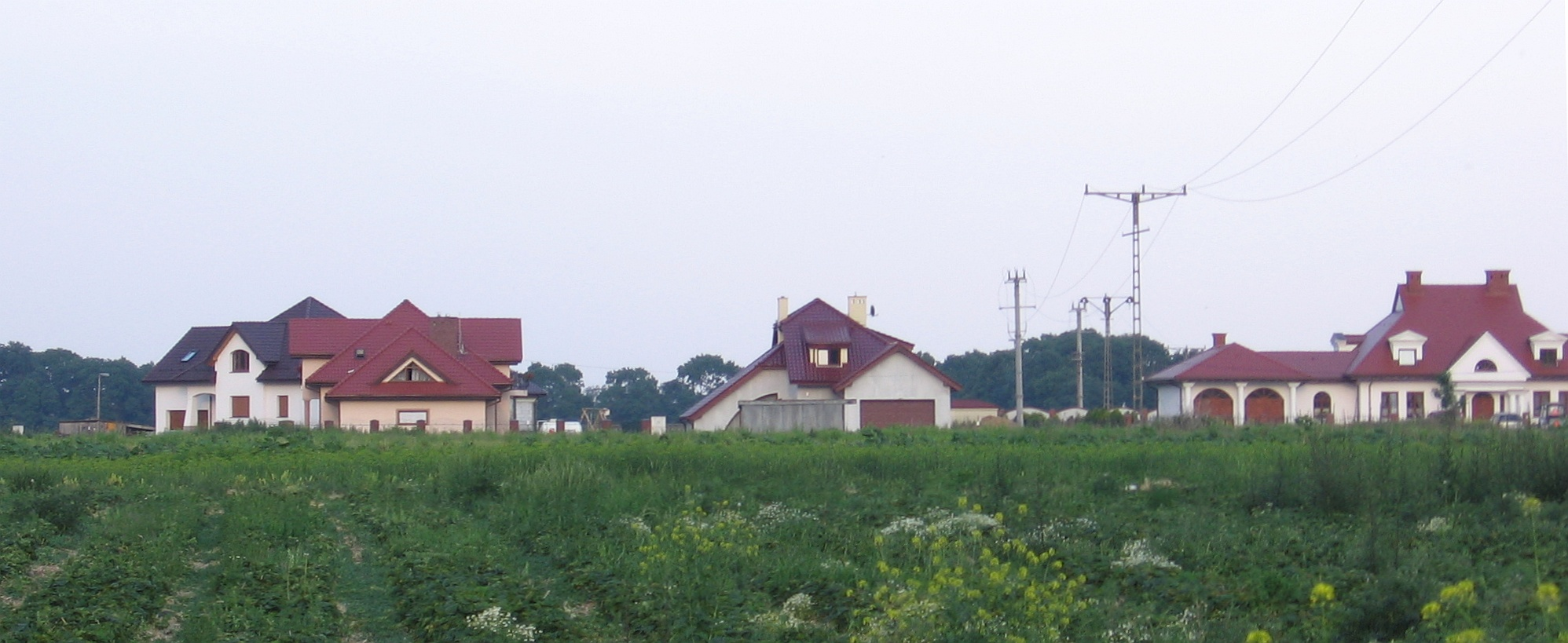
- Houses in Radomierzyce.

- Location within Poland
- Coordinates: 51°02′35″N 17°02′23″E
- Country: Poland
- Voivodeship: Lower Silesian
- County: Wrocław
- Gmina: Siechnice

Radomierzyce [radɔmjɛˈʐɨt͡sɛ] is a village in the administrative district of Gmina Siechnice, within Wrocław County, Lower Silesian Voivodeship, in south-western Poland.
