= Durok =

- Village
- Location within Poland
- Coordinates: 51°00′41″N 17°12′18″E
- Country: Poland
- Voivodeship: Lower Silesian
- County: Wrocław
- Gmina: Siechnice

Durok [ˈdurɔk] is a village in the administrative district of Gmina Siechnice, within Wrocław County, Lower Silesian Voivodeship, in south-western Poland. The village is one of the place that suffered during the great flood in 1997.
