= Sulimów, Lower Silesian Voivodeship =

Sulimów
- Village
- Location within Poland
- Coordinates: 51°00′05″N 17°07′41″E
- Country: Poland
- Voivodeship: Lower Silesian
- County: Wrocław
- Gmina: Siechnice

Sulimów [suˈlimuf] is a village in the administrative district of Gmina Siechnice, within Wrocław County, Lower Silesian Voivodeship, in south-western Poland.
