= Sulęcin, Lower Silesian Voivodeship =

Sulęcin
- Village
- Location within Poland
- Coordinates: 51°02′N 17°09′E
- Country: Poland
- Voivodeship: Lower Silesian
- County: Wrocław
- Gmina: Siechnice
- Elevation: 124 m (407 ft)

Population
  - Total: 116
- Time zone: UTC+1 (CET)
  - Summer (DST): UTC+2 (CEST)
- Vehicle registration: DWR

Sulęcin (Polish pronunciation: [suˈlɛɲt͡ɕin]) is a village in the administrative district of Gmina Siechnice, within Wrocław County, Lower Silesian Voivodeship, in south-western Poland.
