= Sławin =

- Village
- Location within Poland
- Coordinates: 51°38′N 18°4′E
- Country: Poland
- Voivodeship: Greater Poland
- County: Ostrów
- Gmina: Sieroszewice
- Population: 270

Sławin [ˈswavin] is a village in the administrative district of Gmina Sieroszewice, within Ostrów County, Greater Poland Voivodeship, in west-central Poland.
