= Gmina Siechnice =

Gmina Siechnice Siechnice Commune
- Gmina
- Flag Coat of arms
- Interactive map of Gmina Siechnice
- Coordinates (Siechnice): 51°2′N 17°9′E
- Country: Poland
- Voivodeship: Lower Silesian
- County: Wrocław
- Seat: Siechnice

Area
  - Total: 98.57 km^{2} (38.06 sq mi)

Population (2019-06-30)
  - Total: 22,396
  - Density: 227.2/km^{2} (588.5/sq mi)
  - Urban: 8,113
  - Rural: 14,283
- Website: http://www.siechnice.gmina.pl/

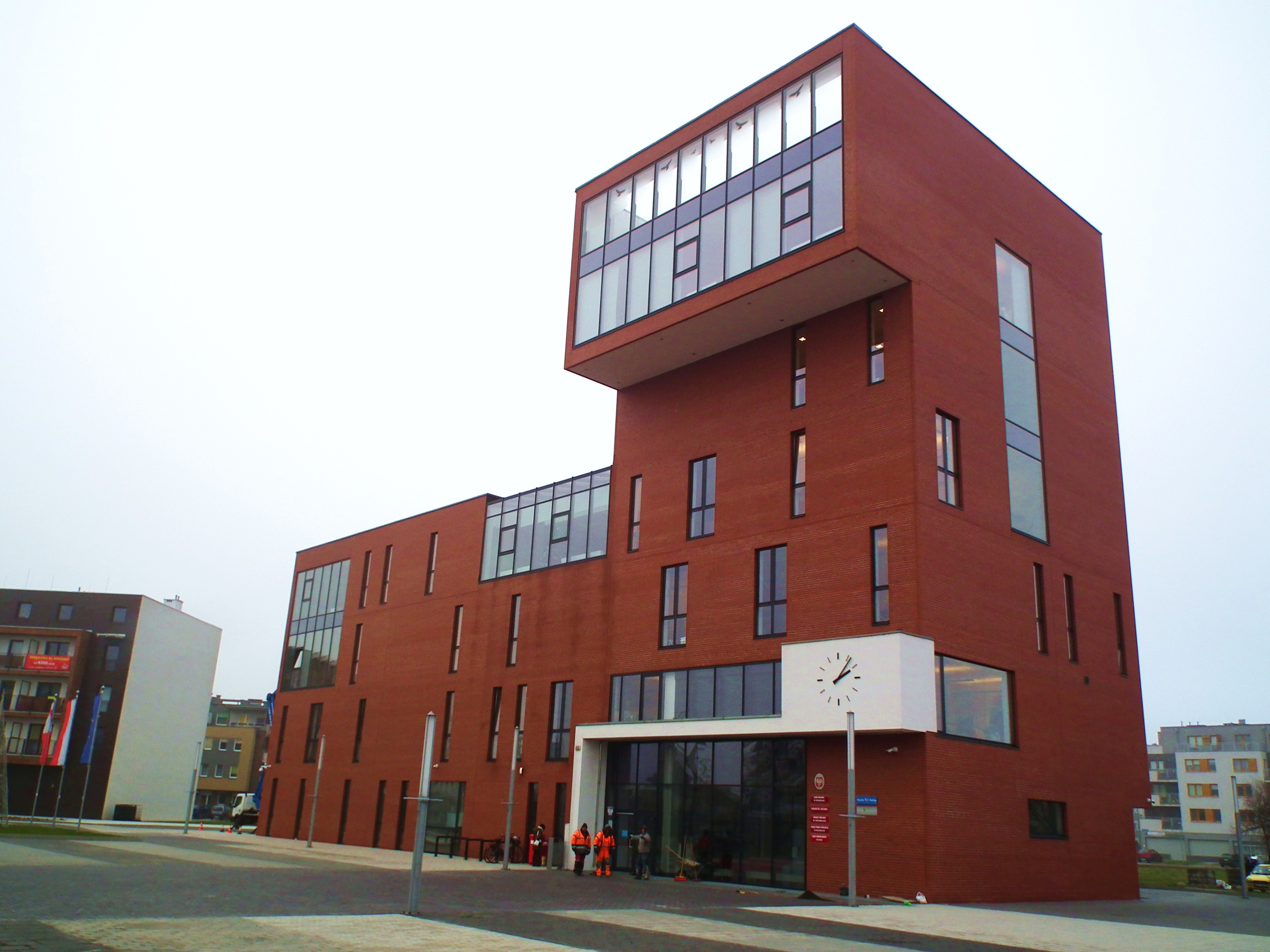
Siechnice town hall in 2016 (colloquially called "Peryskop" due to its shape)

Gmina Siechnice is an urban-rural gmina (administrative district) in Wrocław County, Lower Silesian Voivodeship, in south-western Poland. Its seat is the town of Siechnice, which lies approximately 13 kilometres (8 mi) south-east of the county and regional capital, Wrocław. It is part of the Wrocław metropolitan area.

Until 1 January 2010, the gmina was called Gmina Święta Katarzyna and had its seat in the village of Święta Katarzyna, located just west of Siechnice.

The gmina covers an area of 98.57 square kilometres (38.1 sq mi), and as of 2019 its total population was 22,396.

== Neighbouring gminy ==
Gmina Siechnice is bordered by the city of Wrocław and by the gminas of Czernica, Domaniów, Kobierzyce, Oława and Żórawina.

== Villages ==
Apart from the town of Siechnice, the gmina contains the villages of Biestrzyków, Blizanowice, Bogusławice, Durok, Groblice, Grodziszów, Iwiny, Kotowice, Łukaszowice, Mokry Dwór, Ozorzyce, Radomierzyce, Radwanice, Smardzów, Sulęcin, Sulimów, Święta Katarzyna, Szostakowice, Zacharzyce, Zębice and Żerniki Wrocławskie.
