= Święta Katarzyna, Lower Silesian Voivodeship =

Święta Katarzyna
- Village
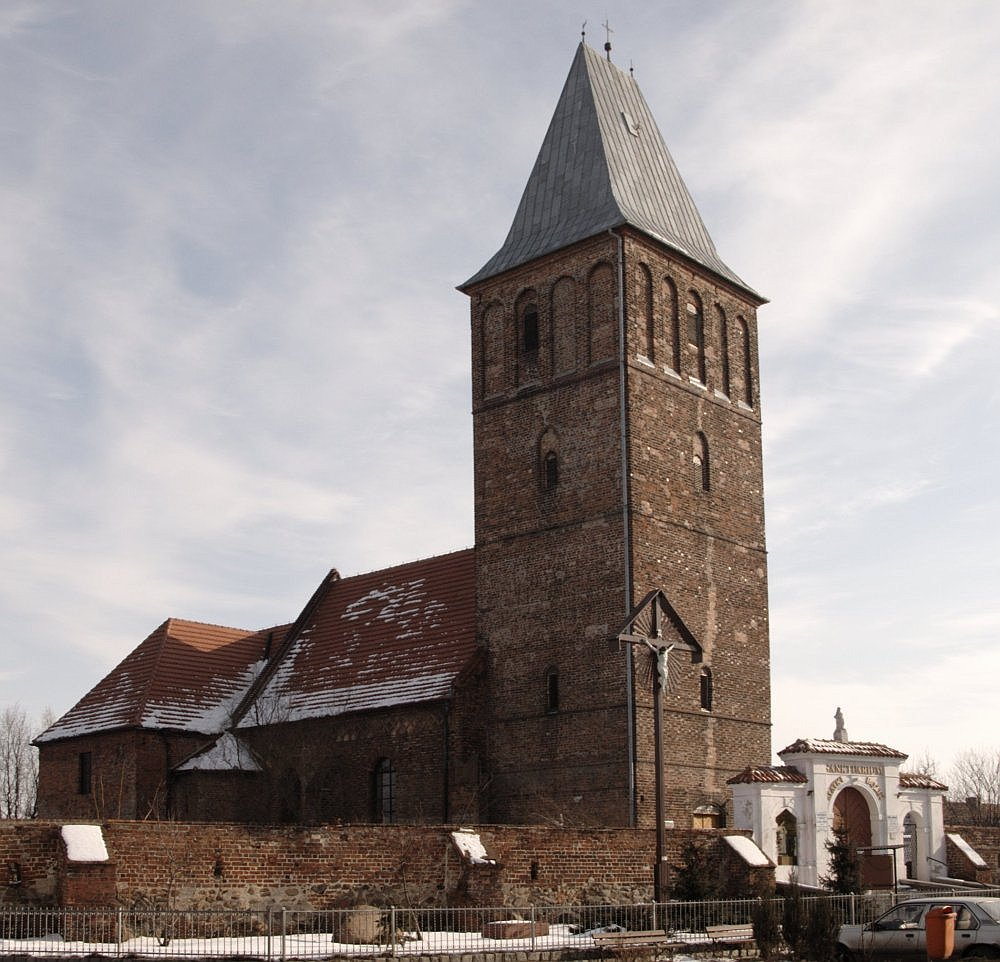
- Church of Saint Catherine

- Coat of arms

- Location within Poland
- Coordinates: 51°02′N 17°07′E
- Country: Poland
- Voivodeship: Lower Silesian
- County: Wrocław
- District: Siechnice
- First written record: 1257
- Elevation: 125 m (410 ft)

Population (2025)
  - Total: 3,104
- Time zone: GMT+1
- Postal code: 55-010
- Telephone code: (+48) 71
- Vehicle registration: DWR
- SIMC: 0881213

Święta Katarzyna (Polish pronunciation: [ˈɕfjɛnta kataˈʐɨna], German: Kattern, [ˈkatɛɐ̯n]), lit. 'Saint Catherine', is a village in Gmina Siechnice, Wrocław County, Lower Silesian Voivodeship, in south-western Poland.

Before 1 January 2010, the district of Gmina Siechnice was called Gmina Święta Katarzyna, and Święta Katarzyna was its seat. (This was one of only two cases in Poland where a gmina contained a town but had its administrative seat in a village; the remaining one is Gmina Nowe Skalmierzyce.)

The village had a population of 1,872 in 2006, rising to 2258 in 2015. It first appears in written records in 1257 as Santa Katherine.

Buildings of interest include the fortified church of Saint Catherine, which dates to at least 1257, and has been rebuilt on several occasions, including in 1720 and after the Second World War. The church contains a picture of the Madonna of Częstochowa, and is considered a Marian shrine.

The Wrocław eastern bypass runs through Święta Katarzyna, improving the village's transport links with the city.
