= Mokry Dwór, Lower Silesian Voivodeship =

Mokry Dwór
- Village
- Location within Poland
- Coordinates: 51°04′19″N 17°07′28″E
- Country: Poland
- Voivodeship: Lower Silesian
- County: Wrocław
- Gmina: Siechnice
- Population: 380

Mokry Dwór (Polish pronunciation: [ˈmɔkrɨ ˈdvur], lit. 'Wet Manor', German: Althofnass, [ˈalthoːfnas]) is a village in the administrative district of Gmina Siechnice, within Wrocław County, Lower Silesian Voivodeship, in south-western Poland.
