= Radwanice, Wrocław County =

Village in Lower Silesian Voivodeship, Poland

Radwanice
- Village
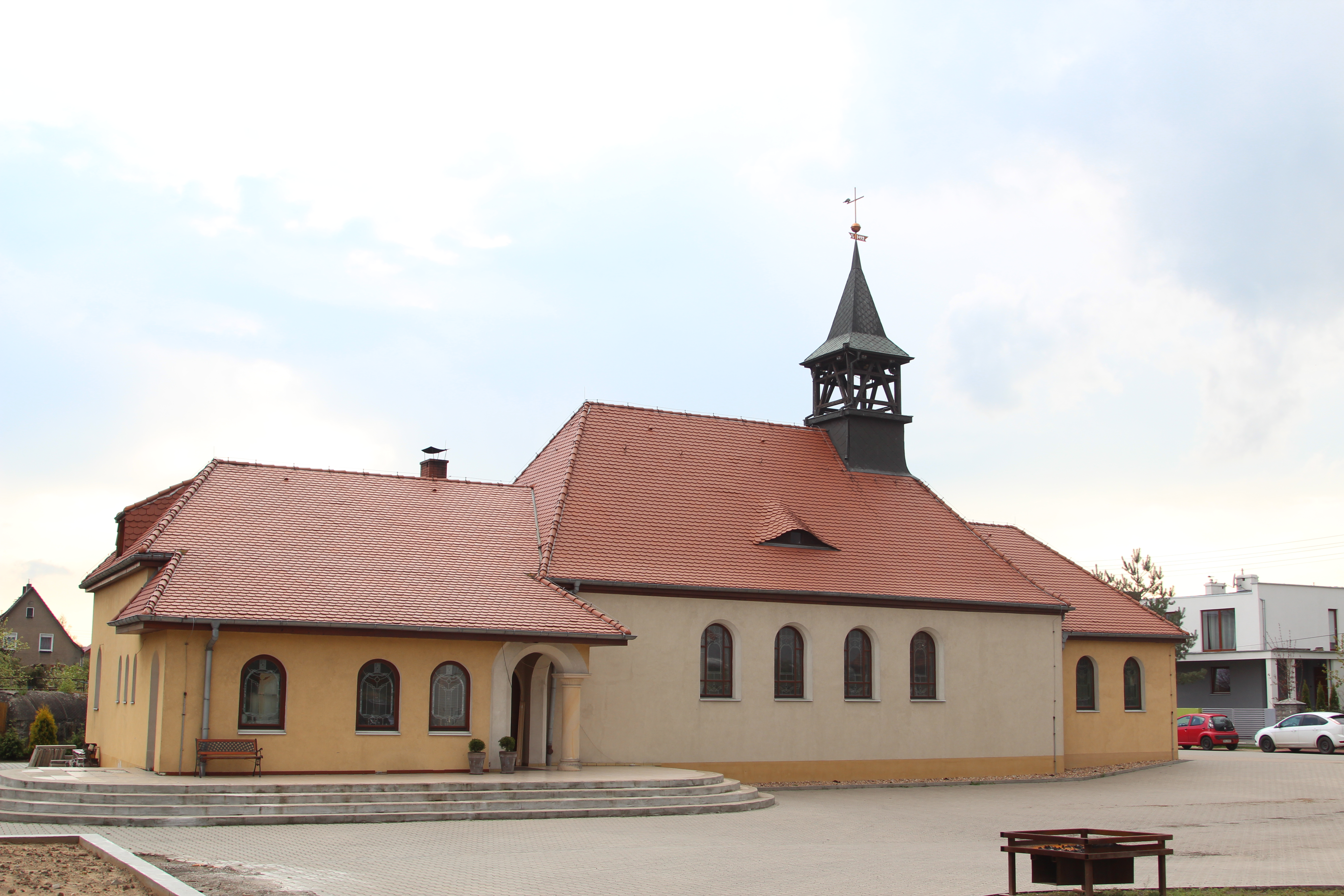

- Location within Poland
- Coordinates: 51°3′30″N 17°6′14″E
- Country: Poland
- Voivodeship: Lower Silesian
- County: Wrocław
- Gmina: Siechnice
- Population: 2,328

Radwanice (Polish pronunciation: [radvaˈɲit͡sɛ], German: Radwanitz, [ˈʁaːdvanɪt͡s]) is a village in the administrative district of Gmina Siechnice, within Wrocław County, Lower Silesian Voivodeship, in south-western Poland.

== Name ==
The village was first mentioned as Radwentitz in 1338. The name appeared in various forms such as Radwenticz, Radewanawicz (1353), Radwanicz (1382), villa Radwanitz (1579), Radvanitz (1651–52), Rattwanitz (1743), Radwanitz (1795), Radwanitz (1845), Radwancice, Radwanitz (1896), Wasserborn (1937), Radwanitz, Wasserborn (1941).

The village is named after the personal name Radowan, was used to form Radwan by adding the suffix -ice 'of someone'. The name was Germanized as Radwanitz. During the Nazi era, the settlement was renamed to Wasserborn, in order to remove traces of its Polish origin. After World War II, the village was officially named Radwanice on November 12, 1946.
