= Melchior Hedloff =

17th century Silesian felon and serial killer

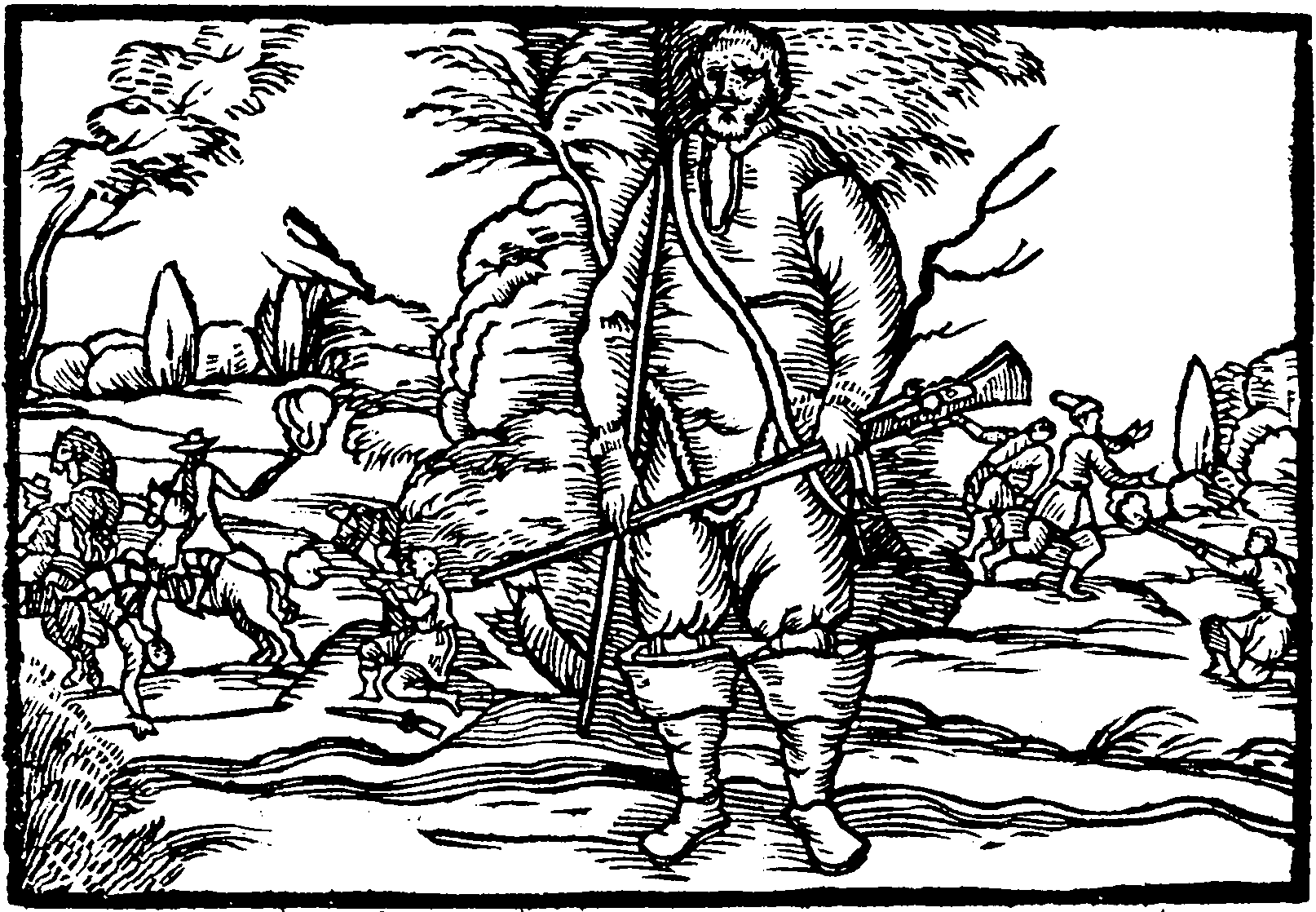
- Born: 1605/1606; Kąty Śląskie
- Died: January 19, 1654 (48); Oleśnica
- Cause of death: execution by Breaking wheel
- Other names: Melcher Shooter, Melcher Hedlof, Melchior the Rifleman
- Occupations: Soldier and poacher
- Capture status: executed

Details
- Date: 1648-1653
- Country: Polish–Lithuanian Commonwealth
- Killed: 251
- Weapons: arquebus and Turkish saber

Melchior Hedloff (1605/1606 - January 19, 1654) was a 17th century Silesian highwayman, rapist, cannibal and murderer who terrorized the Polish–Lithuanian Commonwealth from 1648 to 1653. He was later captured and executed for 251 murders.

== Early life ==
Hedloff was born in Kąty Śląskie (part of Modern Poland) between 1605 and 1606. Little is known about his early years except that at some point he fought in the Thirty Years' War supporting the Bohemian Revolt in Cosel, Trebnitz, and Wrocław. He also at married a woman named Anna and had a daughter.

== Criminal Activity ==
During his service, he engaged in his first acts of murder and robbery and took part in several instances of war rape against several women including his daughter. After the war, he began to work as a poacher and then became a highwayman and the Międzyborska forests and the nearby towns of Chojnik, Pawełki, Niwki, Kuźnica Czeszycka, and Surmin. Over the course of 11 years, Hedloff robbed and murder one hundred Poles, six Jews and ten women. He would kill travelers with a arquebus and mutilate their bodies with a Turkish saber. In one incident, Melchoir raped a pregnant woman, cut open her womb, removed the infant within and ate its heart.

Due to his crimes, Prince Sylwiusz Nimrod, Duke of Württemberg-Oels issued a manhunt for Hedloff. Although he evaded capture by hiding in the Międzyborska forests, his wife was arrested and later his daughter turned herself in voluntarily. Hedloff's wife revealed that she had been tasked to bring him the heart of a small child which, as he believed, would bring him extraordinary abilities. Being afraid of him, she obeyed, but the origin of the heart was never truly known. Both wife and daughter confessed to being accomplices in his crimes. Both were tortured and broken on the wheel. Hedloff's two brothers, Maciej and Jerzy, were also captured and tortured for knowing about the crimes of their brother and accepting the victim's stolen goods as gifts.

== Capture and Execution ==
Hedloff was captured on November 2, 1653, in the village of Łąki near Sułów and after a brief trial, Hedloff was sentenced to death on January 19, 1654. On that day, the executioner took Melchior Hedloff, tied to a cart, around the four corners of the Oleśnica town square. Before beginning the public spectacle, Hedloff's fingers were torn off one at a time. At each of the four corners Hedloff was then skinned alive, with the exposed flesh cauterized so as to prevent him from bleeding to death. At the first corner, the skin of the left arm; at the second, the left breast; the third, the right shoulder; and at the fourth corner, the right breast. It was noted that Hedloff did not utter a single groan, nor did he show any signs of remorse. After being dragged around, bones broken, heart cut out, Hedloff was taken out of the city where his body was quartered. Its pieces were later distributed and hung at square's four corners to deter criminals.
