= Zabnik =

Zabnik may refer to:

- Żabnik (disambiguation)
- Žabnik (disambiguation)
