= Odolanów =

Town in Greater Poland Voivodeship, Poland

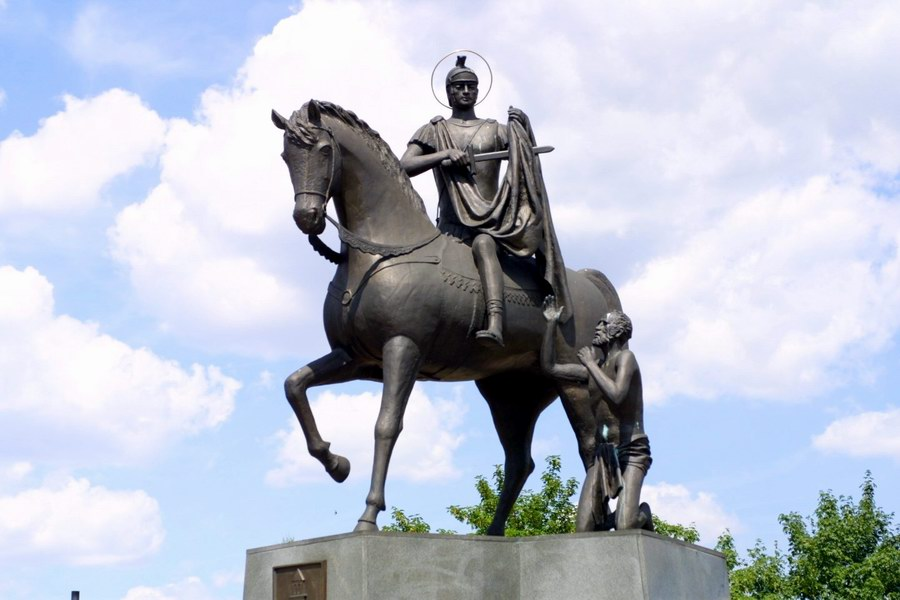
- Statue of Saint Martin

- Flag Coat of arms

- Location within Poland
- Coordinates: 51°34′N 17°40′E
- Country: Poland
- Voivodeship: Greater Poland
- County: Ostrów
- Gmina: Odolanów

Area
  - Total: 4.76 km^{2} (1.84 sq mi)

Population (2010)
  - Total: 5,003
  - Density: 1,050/km^{2} (2,720/sq mi)
- Time zone: UTC+1 (CET)
  - Summer (DST): UTC+2 (CEST)
- Postal code: 63-430
- Vehicle registration: POS
- Climate: Cfb
- Website: http://www.odolanow.pl

Odolanów is a town in Ostrów County, in the Greater Poland Voivodeship, in south-central Poland, about 10 kilometres (6 miles) south-west from Ostrów Wielkopolski, with over 5,000 inhabitants.

== History ==
The first written document that mentions Odolanów dates back to 1301, when it was part of the fragmented Piast-ruled Kingdom of Poland and the location hosted a castle on the border between Greater Poland and Silesia. A settlement arose next to the castle, which acquired town rights in 1403 from King Władysław II Jagiełło. It was a royal town of the Polish Crown, administratively located in the Kalisz County in the Kalisz Voivodeship in the Greater Poland Province.

In 1629 on the east side of the town king Sigismund III Vasa founded the New Town also called Konstancja (after the king's second wife). Nowadays it is a part of Odolanów named Górka. At the end of the 17th century there were 18 shoemakers, 8 tailors, 3 millers, 3 tradesmen and 9 other craftsmen in the town. The majority of the population were tilthing and breeding cattle.

Until 1793, the town and surrounding villages belonged to princes, kings, or noblemen. Monarchs granted land to various rich feudals as fief or land tenancy.

In 1793 Odolanów was annexed by Prussia in the Second Partition of Poland. After the successful Greater Poland uprising of 1806, it was regained by Poles and included within the short-lived Duchy of Warsaw, and then in 1815 it was reannexed by Prussia.

The citizens took part in the Greater Poland uprising (1848) during the Spring of Nations, fighting against better armed Prussians in the battle of Odolanów on 21 April 1848. They also supported the Polish January Uprising of 1863, delivering weapons and clothes to the insurgents.

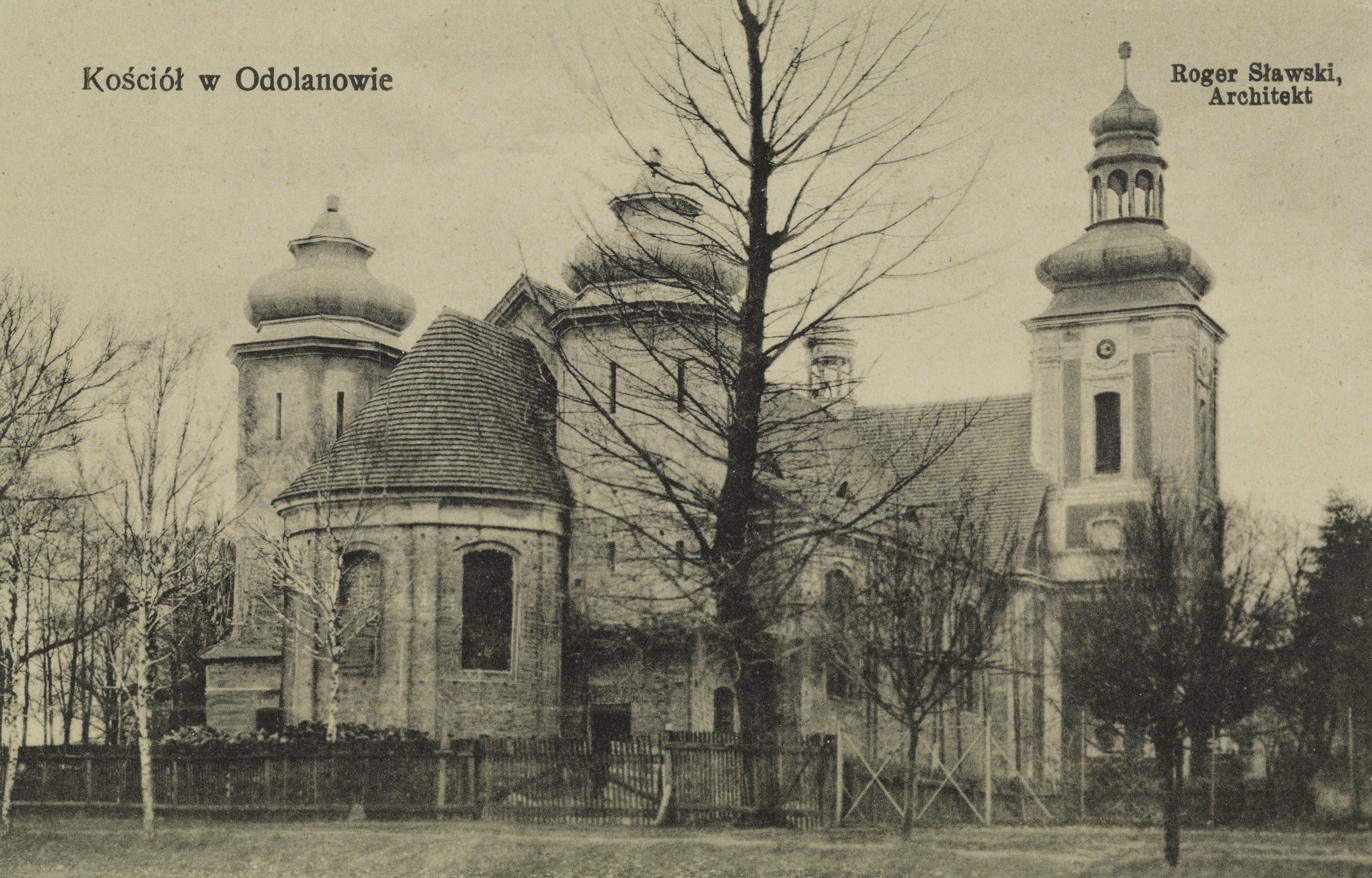
Saint Martin church in the early 20th century

From 1871 it was part of Germany, however, despite the Germanisation led by the German Empire, Odolanów preserved its Polish character – in 1910 at least 72.5% of inhabitants were speaking Polish. In addition to Poles, Jews and Germans also lived there. The Protestant church built in 1780 and the 1835 synagogue are monuments of Odolanów’s once multicultural society.

In 1909 the rail connection between Odolanów and Ostrów Wielkopolski was opened.

The events shortly after World War I (Republic of Ostrów and the Greater Poland Uprising) are an important part of the town’s history. On 12 November 1918, a day after Poland declared independence, a Worker’s and Soldier’s Council was established in the town. Some days later the citizens elected deputies to the Polish Parliament in the Prussian Partition (Polski Sejm Dzielnicowy). On 31 December 1918 Poles took power in Odolanów from Germans as part of the Greater Poland Uprising. Insurgents from Odolanów fought a. o. in the battle of Granowiec during the night of 14–15 January 1918. In 1919 the town was confirmed to be reintegrated with the Second Polish Republic. 74 insurgents from the former Odolanów County were killed in the uprising, and a monument dedicated to them was unveiled in the park in 1923. According to the 1921 census, the town had a population of 2,437, 97.1% Polish and 2.9% German.

On 1 September 1939, the first day of the German invasion of Poland, which started World War II, Odolanów was quickly captured by the Wehrmacht. The German administration was using terror, many Poles were expropriated, expelled, killed or sent to concentration camps. Local mayor Jan Krak was arrested and imprisoned in nearby Kalisz and then murdered in a large massacre of over 70 Poles from the region, carried out in Winiary on 14 December 1939. The Germans destroyed the pre-war monument to the fallen insurgents of the Greater Poland uprising, and established and operated a Nazi prison and a forced labour camp for Jews in the town. The local Polish police chief was murdered by the Russians in the Katyn massacre in 1940. The German occupation in Odolanów was over on 22 January 1945, when Soviet tanks entered the town. Some soldiers of the Polish underground continued their resistance, now against the Soviet dominance and the puppet Stalinist government (so-called cursed soldiers). On 22 October 1945 the troop of Jan Kempiński, nom de guerre Błysk, operating in the Odolanów area was smashed by the Department of Security forces.

== Demographics ==
Historical population

Year	Pop.	±%
1880	2,197	—
1890	2,268	+3.2%
1910	2,428	+7.1%
1921	2,437	+0.4%
1931	2,472	+1.4%

Year	Pop.	±%
1939	2,491	+0.8%
1950	2,288	−8.1%
1960	2,951	+29.0%
2010	5,003	+69.5%

== Notable people ==
- Jan Zborowski (1538–1603), Polish Court Hetman of the Crown
- Rafał Leszczyński (1650-1703), Polish nobleman, father of King of Poland Stanisław Leszczyński
- Wilhelm Altmann (1862-1951), historian and musicologist
