= Grabownica =

Grabownica may refer to the following places in Poland:

- Grabownica, Gmina Krośnice in Lower Silesian Voivodeship (south-west Poland)
- Grabownica, Gmina Milicz in Lower Silesian Voivodeship (south-west Poland)
- Grabownica, Świętokrzyskie Voivodeship (south-central Poland)
