= Łazy Małe =

Łazy Małe may refer to the following places in Poland:

- Łazy Małe, Lower Silesian Voivodeship (south-west Poland)
- Łazy Małe, Podlaskie Voivodeship (north-east Poland)
