= Zelezniki =

Zelezniki may refer to:

- Železniki, town in Slovenia
- Żeleźniki (disambiguation), villages in Poland
