= Krośnice =

Krośnice may refer to the following places in Poland:

- Krośnice, Lower Silesian Voivodeship (south-west Poland)
- Krośnice, Masovian Voivodeship (east-central Poland)
