= Czesławice =

Czesławice may refer to the following places in Poland:

- Czesławice, Lower Silesian Voivodeship (south-west Poland)
- Czesławice, Lublin Voivodeship (east Poland)
- Czesławice, Gmina Sośnie, Ostrów County in Greater Poland Voivodeship (west-central Poland)
- Czesławice, Wągrowiec County in Greater Poland Voivodeship (west-central Poland)
