= Kotlarka =

Kotlarka may refer to the following villages in:

== Poland ==
- Kotlarka, Lower Silesian Voivodeship (south-west Poland)
- Kotlarka, Masovian Voivodeship (east-central Poland)

== Ukraine ==
- Kotliarka, the Popilnia Raion of the Zhytomyr Oblast, the historical region Right-bank Ukraine
