= Chojnik (disambiguation) =

Chojnik is the name of a castle near Jelenia Góra in south-west Poland.

Chojnik may also refer to the following villages:

- Chojnik, Greater Poland Voivodeship (west-central Poland)
- Chojnik, Lesser Poland Voivodeship (south Poland)
- Chojnik, Warmian-Masurian Voivodeship (north Poland)
