= Szymkowiak =

Szymkowiak is a Polish surname. Notable people include:

- Edward Szymkowiak (1932–1990), Polish footballer
- Janina Szymkowiak, Polish beatified nun
- Jules Szymkowiak, Dutch racing driver
- Kerstin Szymkowiak (born 1977), German skeleton racer
- Mirosław Szymkowiak (born 1976), Polish footballer
- Tomasz Szymkowiak (born 1983), Polish athlete
