= Młynik =

Młynik may refer to the following places:

- Młynik, Koło County in Greater Poland Voivodeship (central Poland)
- Młynik, Gmina Sośnie, Ostrów County in Greater Poland Voivodeship (west-central Poland)
- Młynik, Kuyavian-Pomeranian Voivodeship (north-central Poland)
- Młynik, Podlaskie Voivodeship (north-east Poland)
- Młynik, Pomeranian Voivodeship (north Poland)
- Młynik, Warmian-Masurian Voivodeship (north Poland)
