= Pierstnica =

- Village
- Location within Poland
- Coordinates: 51°25′36″N 17°21′24″E
- Country: Poland
- Voivodeship: Lower Silesian
- County: Milicz
- Gmina: Krośnice
- Population: 510

Pierstnica [pjɛrstˈnit͡sa] is a village in the administrative district of Gmina Krośnice, within Milicz County, Lower Silesian Voivodeship, in south-western Poland.
