= Wierzchowice, Milicz County =

Wierzchowice
- Village
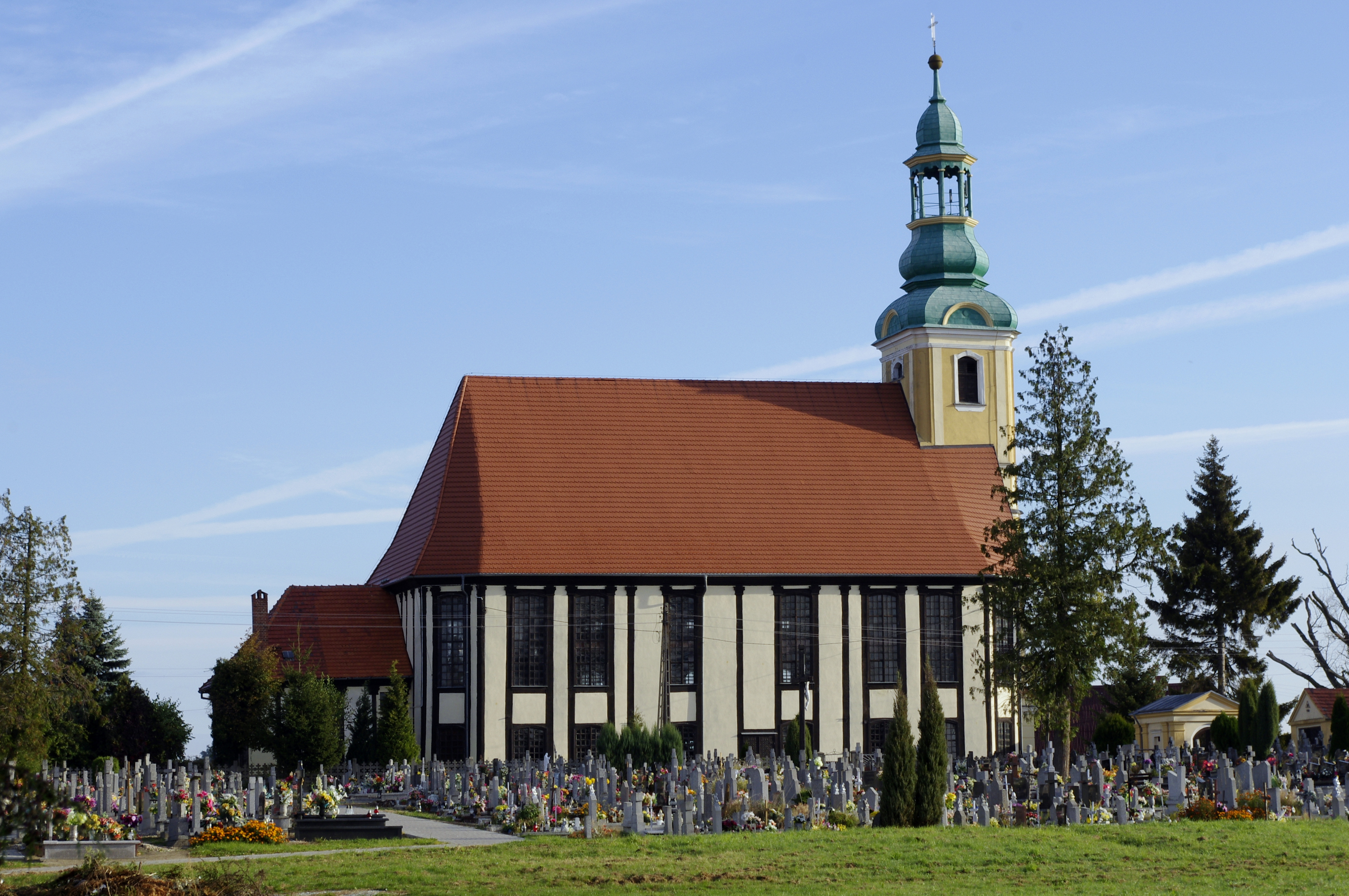
- Church of the Nativity of the Virgin Mary in Wierzchowice

- Location within Poland
- Coordinates: 51°29′N 17°20′E
- Country: Poland
- Voivodeship: Lower Silesian
- County: Milicz
- Gmina: Krośnice
- Population: 670
- Time zone: UTC+1 (CET)
  - Summer (DST): UTC+2 (CEST)

Wierzchowice [vjɛʂxɔˈvit͡sɛ] is a village in the administrative district of Gmina Krośnice, within Milicz County, Lower Silesian Voivodeship, in south-western Poland.

During World War II the Germans established and operated a subcamp of the Gross-Rosen concentration camp in the village, whose prisoners were Jewish women transported from the Auschwitz concentration camp.
