= Smugi, Greater Poland Voivodeship =

Smugi
- Settlement
- Location within Poland
- Coordinates: 51°32′7″N 17°35′12″E
- Country: Poland
- Voivodeship: Greater Poland
- County: Ostrów
- Gmina: Sośnie

Smugi [ˈsmuɡi] is a settlement in the administrative district of Gmina Sośnie, within Ostrów County, Greater Poland Voivodeship, in west-central Poland.
