= Gmina Sośnie =

Gmina Sośnie Sośnie Commune
- Gmina
- Coat of arms
- Interactive map of Gmina Sośnie
- Coordinates (Sośnie): 51°28′N 17°37′E
- Country: Poland
- Voivodeship: Greater Poland
- County: Ostrów
- Seat: Sośnie

Area
  - Total: 187.46 km^{2} (72.38 sq mi)

Population (2006)
  - Total: 6,625
  - Density: 35.34/km^{2} (91.53/sq mi)
- Website: http://www.sosnie.pl

Gmina Sośnie is a rural gmina (administrative district) in Ostrów County, Greater Poland Voivodeship, in west-central Poland. Its seat is the village of Sośnie, which lies approximately 22 kilometres (14 mi) south of Ostrów Wielkopolski and 115 km (71 mi) south-east of the regional capital Poznań.

The gmina covers an area of 187.46 square kilometres (72.38 sq mi), and as of 2006 its total population is 6,625.

The gmina contains part of the protected area called Barycz Valley Landscape Park.

== Villages ==
Gmina Sośnie contains the villages and settlements of Bogdaj, Bronisławka, Chojnik, Cieszyn, Czesławice, Dobrzec, Grabie, Granowiec, Janisławice, Jarnostaw, Kałkowskie, Kąty Śląskie, Kocina, Konradów, Kopalina, Krzyżno, Kuźnica Kącka, Łachów, Lipskie, Mariak, Młynik, Moja Wola, Możdżanów, Pawłów, Piła, Smugi, Sobki, Sośnie, Starża, Surmin, Szklarka Śląska and Żabnik.

== Neighbouring gminas ==
Gmina Sośnie is bordered by the gminas of Kobyla Góra, Krośnice, Międzybórz, Milicz, Odolanów, Ostrzeszów, Przygodzice and Twardogóra.
