= Żeleźniki =

Żeleźniki may refer to the following places in Poland:

- Żeleźniki, Lower Silesian Voivodeship (south-west Poland)
- Żeleźniki, Masovian Voivodeship (east-central Poland)
