= Piła, Gmina Sośnie =

Piła
- Village
- Location within Poland
- Coordinates: 51°25′16″N 17°35′24″E
- Country: Poland
- Voivodeship: Greater Poland
- County: Ostrów
- Gmina: Sośnie

Piła [ˈpiwa] is a village in the administrative district of Gmina Sośnie, within Ostrów County, Greater Poland Voivodeship, in west-central Poland.
