= Dobrzec, Greater Poland Voivodeship =

Dobrzec
- Village
- Location within Poland
- Coordinates: 51°25′08″N 17°33′37″E
- Country: Poland
- Voivodeship: Greater Poland
- County: Ostrów
- Gmina: Sośnie

Dobrzec [ˈdɔbʐɛt͡s] is a village in the administrative district of Gmina Sośnie, within Ostrów County, Greater Poland Voivodeship, in west-central Poland.
