= Moja Wola =

- Village
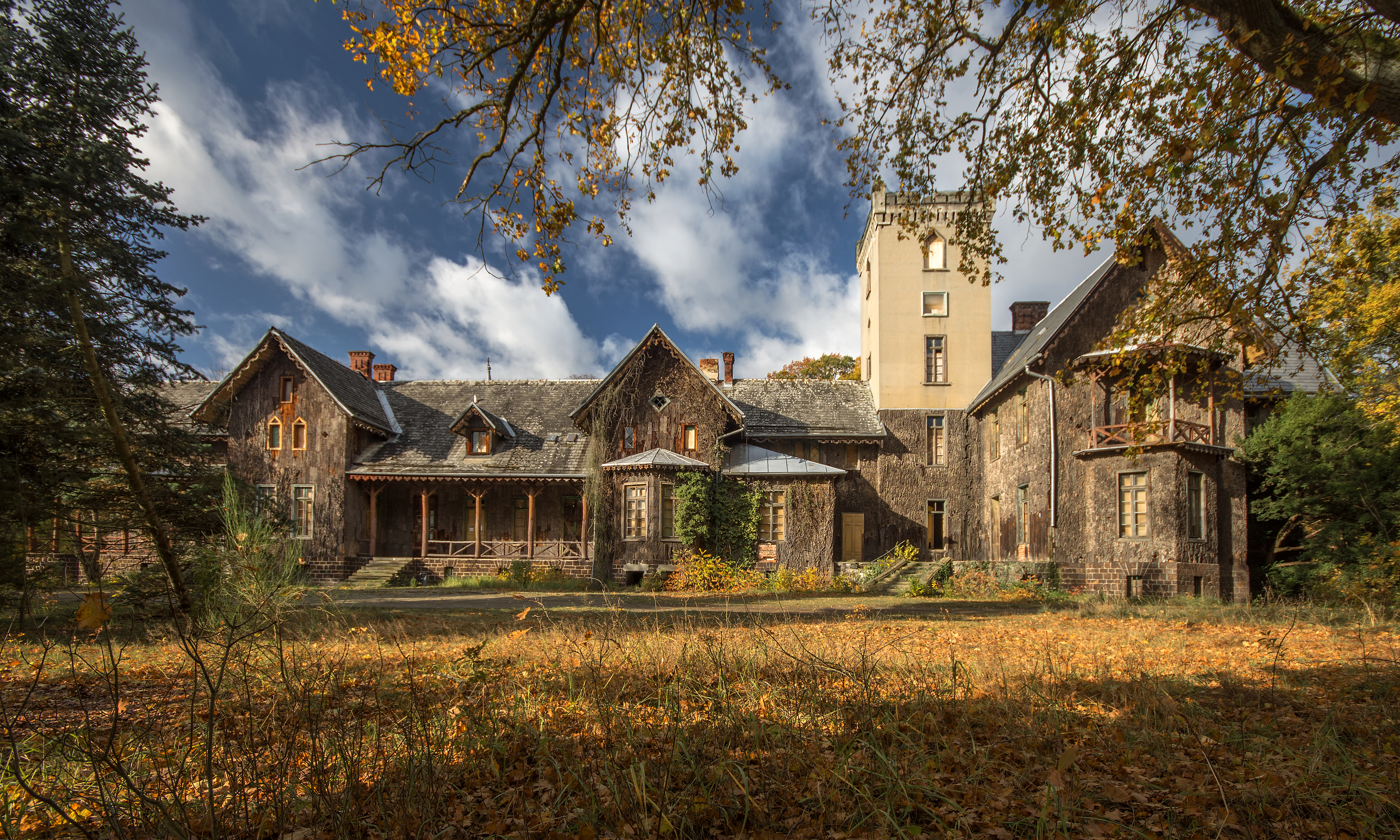
- Hunting palace in Moja Wola

- Location within Poland
- Coordinates: 51°28′14″N 17°36′05″E
- Country: Poland
- Voivodeship: Greater Poland
- County: Ostrów
- Gmina: Sośnie

Moja Wola [ˈmɔja ˈvɔla] is a village in the administrative district of Gmina Sośnie, within Ostrów County, Greater Poland Voivodeship, in west-central Poland.
