= Stara Huta, Lower Silesian Voivodeship =

Stara Huta
- Village
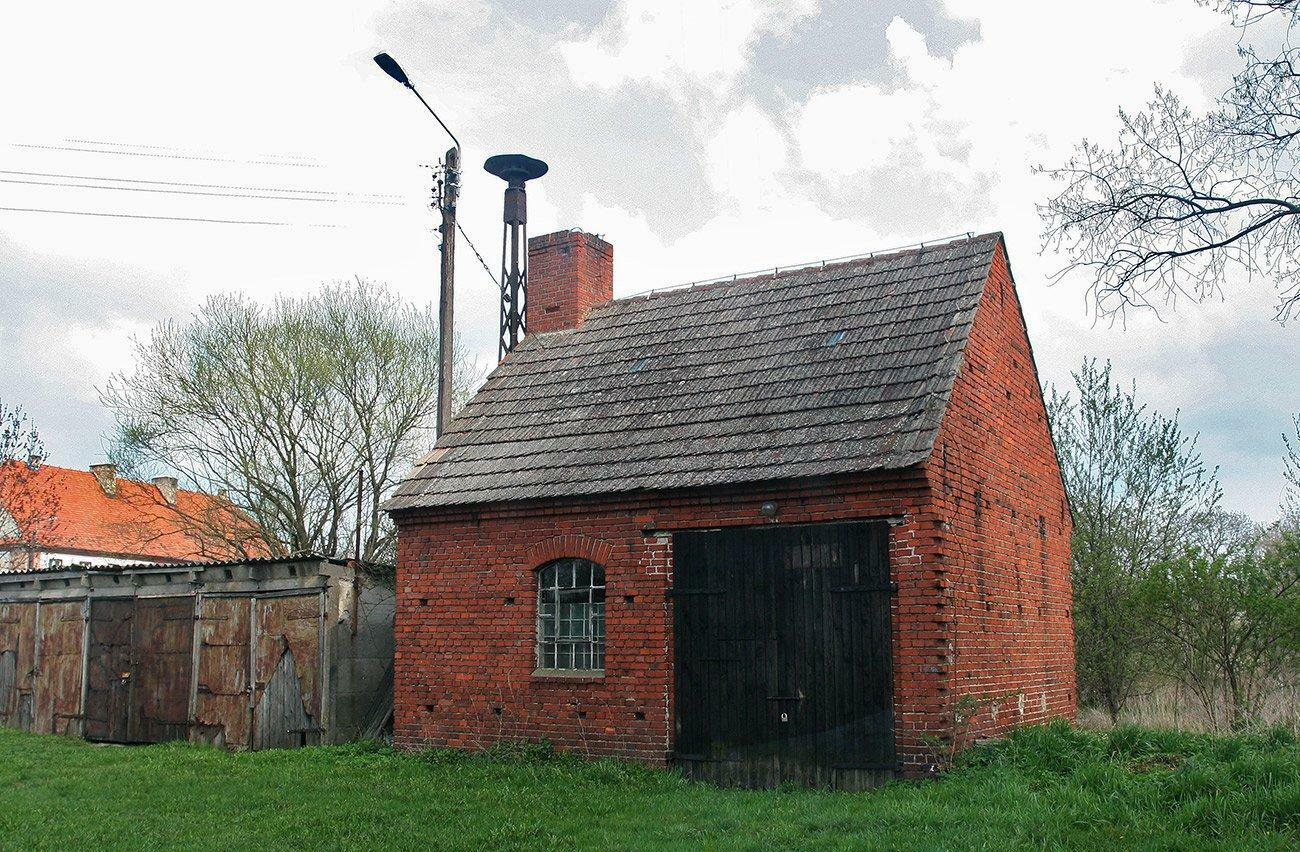

- Location within Poland
- Coordinates: 51°29′42″N 17°30′27″E
- Country: Poland
- Voivodeship: Lower Silesian
- County: Milicz
- Gmina: Krośnice

Stara Huta [ˈstara ˈxuta] is a village in the administrative district of Gmina Krośnice, within Milicz County, Lower Silesian Voivodeship, in south-western Poland.
