= Kubryk, Lower Silesian Voivodeship =

Kubryk
- Village
- Location within Poland
- Coordinates: 51°23′36″N 17°18′15″E
- Country: Poland
- Voivodeship: Lower Silesian
- County: Milicz
- Gmina: Krośnice

Kubryk [ˈkubrɨk] is a village in the administrative district of Gmina Krośnice, within Milicz County, Lower Silesian Voivodeship, in south-western Poland.
