= Kałkowskie =

- Village
- Location within Poland
- Coordinates: 51°28′N 17°41′E
- Country: Poland
- Voivodeship: Greater Poland
- County: Ostrów
- Gmina: Sośnie

Kałkowskie [kau̯ˈkɔfskʲɛ] is a village in the administrative district of Gmina Sośnie, within Ostrów County, Greater Poland Voivodeship, in west-central Poland.
