= Kocina, Greater Poland Voivodeship =

Kocina
- Village
- Location within Poland
- Coordinates: 51°26′21″N 17°37′48″E
- Country: Poland
- Voivodeship: Greater Poland
- County: Ostrów
- Gmina: Sośnie

Kocina [kɔˈt͡ɕina] is a village that is located in the administrative district of Gmina Sośnie, within Ostrów County, Greater Poland Voivodeship, in west-central Poland.
