= Pierstnica Mała =

- Village
- Location within Poland
- Coordinates: 51°26′08″N 17°20′08″E
- Country: Poland
- Voivodeship: Lower Silesian
- County: Milicz
- Gmina: Krośnice

Pierstnica Mała [pjɛrstˈnit͡sa ˈmawa] is a village in the administrative district of Gmina Krośnice, within Milicz County, Lower Silesian Voivodeship, in south-western Poland.
