= Czeszyce =

- Village
- Location within Poland
- Coordinates: 51°29′51″N 17°26′57″E
- Country: Poland
- Voivodeship: Lower Silesian
- County: Milicz
- Gmina: Krośnice

Czeszyce [t͡ʂɛˈʂɨt͡sɛ] is a village in the administrative district of Gmina Krośnice, within Milicz County, Lower Silesian Voivodeship, in south-western Poland.
