= Dąbrowa, Milicz County =

Dąbrowa
- Village
- Location within Poland
- Coordinates: 51°29′25″N 17°21′30″E
- Country: Poland
- Voivodeship: Lower Silesian
- County: Milicz
- Gmina: Krośnice

Dąbrowa [dɔmˈbrɔva] is a village in the administrative district of Gmina Krośnice, within Milicz County, Lower Silesian Voivodeship, in south-western Poland.
