= Sobki, Greater Poland Voivodeship =

Sobki
- Village
- Location within Poland
- Coordinates: 51°25′55″N 17°42′05″E
- Country: Poland
- Voivodeship: Greater Poland
- County: Ostrów
- Gmina: Sośnie

Sobki [ˈsɔpki] is a village in the administrative district of Gmina Sośnie, within Ostrów County, Greater Poland Voivodeship, in west-central Poland.
