= Bukowice, Milicz County =

Bukowice
- Village
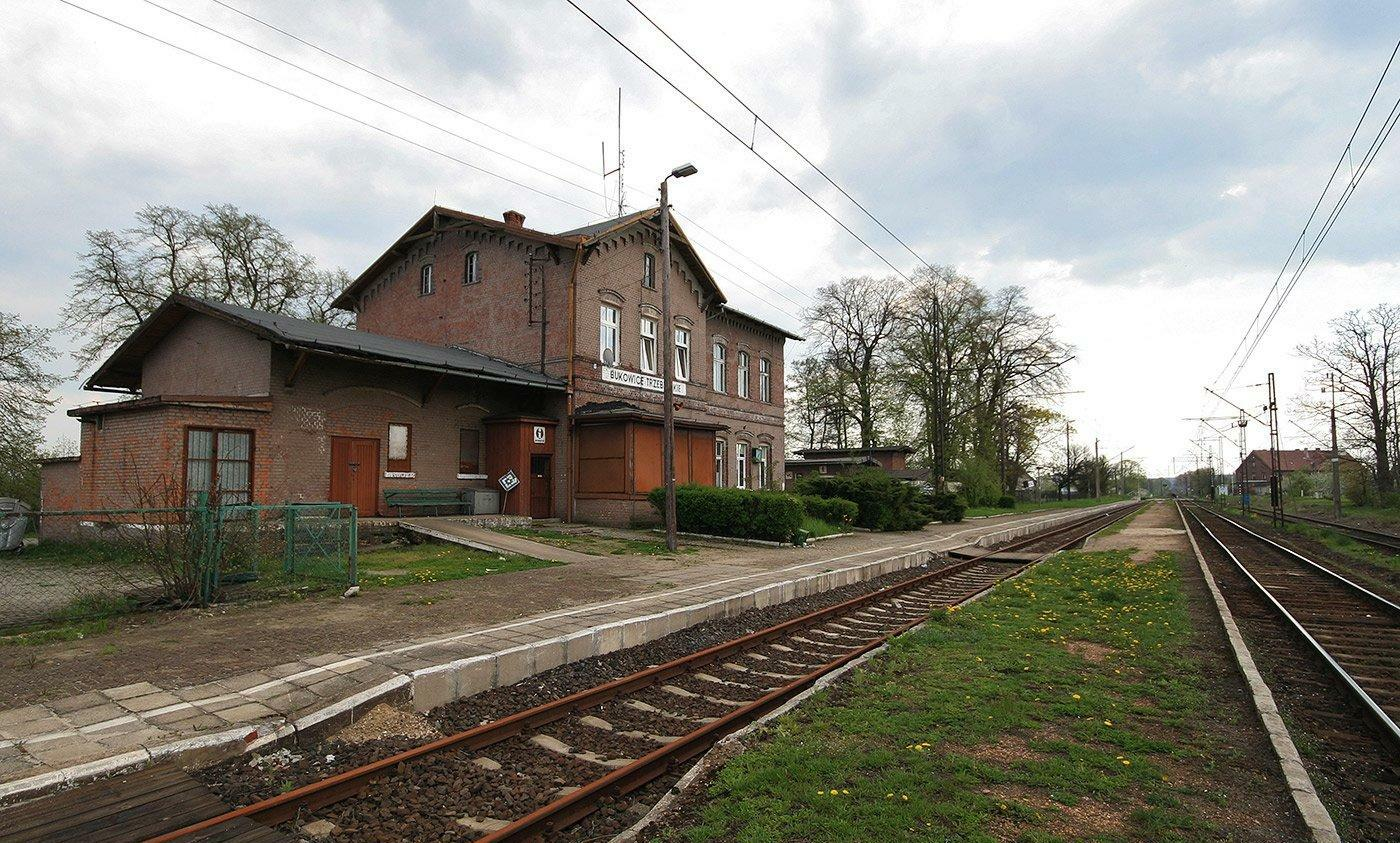
- Railway station

- Location within Poland
- Coordinates: 51°23′43″N 17°21′22″E
- Country: Poland
- Voivodeship: Lower Silesian
- County: Milicz
- Gmina: Krośnice
- Population: 1,850

Bukowice [bukɔˈvit͡sɛ] is a village in the administrative district of Gmina Krośnice, within Milicz County, Lower Silesian Voivodeship, in south-western Poland.
