= Janisławice, Greater Poland Voivodeship =

Janisławice
- Village
- Location within Poland
- Coordinates: 51°29′N 17°32′E
- Country: Poland
- Voivodeship: Greater Poland
- County: Ostrów
- Gmina: Sośnie

Janisławice [janiswaˈvit͡sɛ] is a village in the administrative district of Gmina Sośnie, within Ostrów County, Greater Poland Voivodeship, in west-central Poland.
