= Świebodów =

- Village
- Location within Poland
- Coordinates: 51°28′12″N 17°18′05″E
- Country: Poland
- Voivodeship: Lower Silesian
- County: Milicz
- Gmina: Krośnice

Świebodów (Polish pronunciation: [ɕfjɛˈbɔduf]) is a village in the administrative district of Gmina Krośnice, within Milicz County, Lower Silesian Voivodeship, in south-western Poland.

It is the birthplace of Polish road bicycle racer and Olympic medallist Ryszard Szurkowski.
