= Police, Lower Silesian Voivodeship =

Police
- Village
- Location within Poland
- Coordinates: 51°27′26″N 17°22′40″E
- Country: Poland
- Voivodeship: Lower Silesian
- County: Milicz
- Gmina: Krośnice

Police (Polish pronunciation: [pɔˈlit͡sɛ]) is a village in the administrative district of Gmina Krośnice, within Milicz County, Lower Silesian Voivodeship, in south-western Poland.
