= Cieszyn, Greater Poland Voivodeship =

Cieszyn
- Village
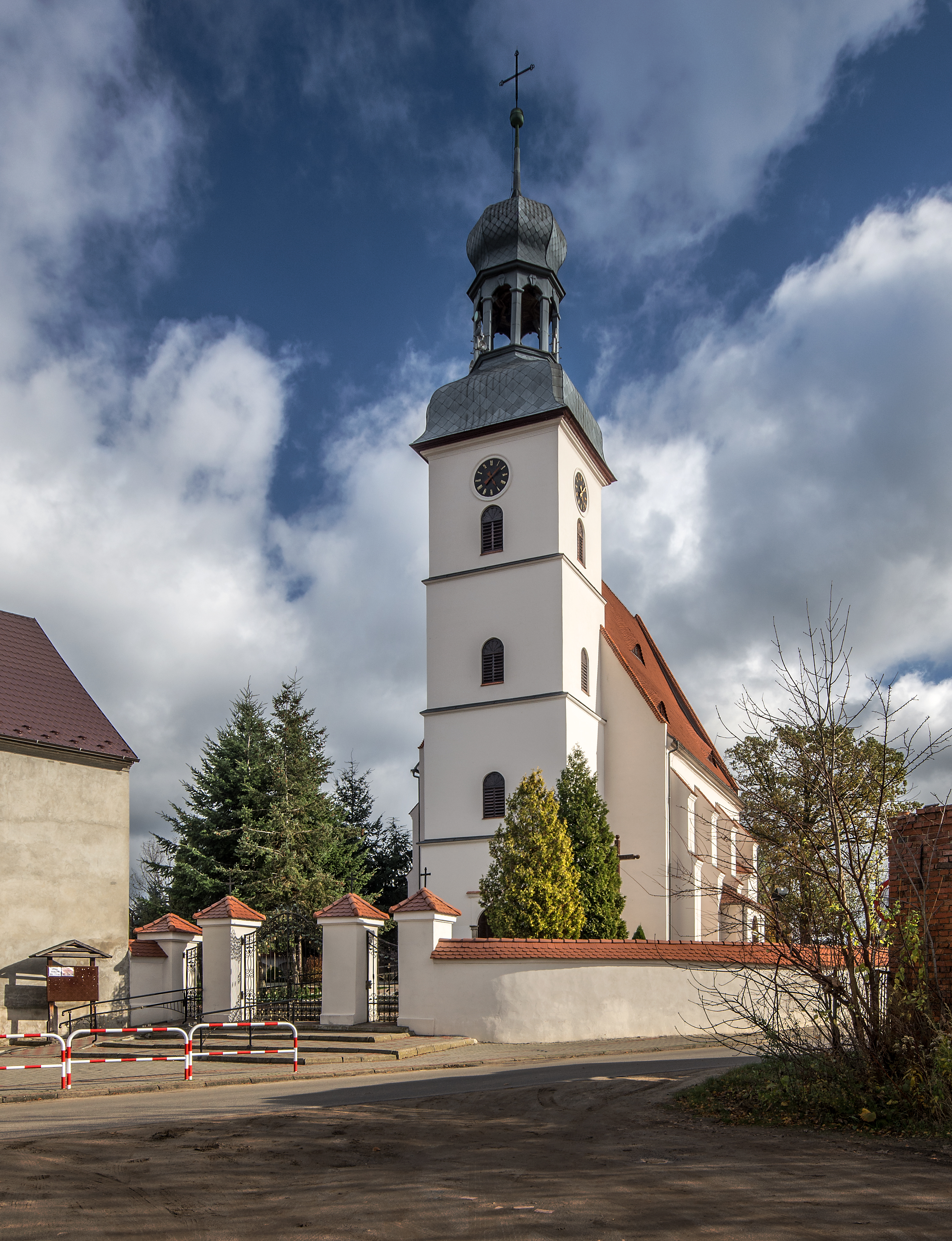
- Church of Saint Archangel Michael

- Location within Poland
- Coordinates: 51°25′N 17°34′E
- Country: Poland
- Voivodeship: Greater Poland
- County: Ostrów
- Gmina: Sośnie

Cieszyn (Polish pronunciation: [ˈt͡ɕɛʂɨn]) is a village in the administrative district of Gmina Sośnie, within Ostrów County, Greater Poland Voivodeship, in west-central Poland.
