= Suliradzice =

- Village
- Location within Poland
- Coordinates: 51°28′30″N 17°30′12″E
- Country: Poland
- Voivodeship: Lower Silesian
- County: Milicz
- Gmina: Krośnice

Suliradzice [suliraˈd͡ʑit͡sɛ] is a village in the administrative district of Gmina Krośnice, within Milicz County, Lower Silesian Voivodeship, in south-western Poland.
