= Grabie, Greater Poland Voivodeship =

Grabie
- Village
- Country: Poland
- Voivodeship: Greater Poland
- County: Ostrów
- Gmina: Sośnie

Grabie [ˈɡrabjɛ] is a village in the administrative district of Gmina Sośnie, within Ostrów County, Greater Poland Voivodeship, in west-central Poland.
