= Łazy-Poręba =

- Village
- Location within Poland
- Coordinates: 51°24′02″N 17°16′08″E
- Country: Poland
- Voivodeship: Lower Silesian
- County: Milicz
- Gmina: Krośnice

Łazy-Poręba [ˈwazɨ pɔˈrɛmba] is a village in the administrative district of Gmina Krośnice, within Milicz County, Lower Silesian Voivodeship, in south-western Poland.
