= Kuźnica Kącka =

- Village
- Location within Poland
- Coordinates: 51°25′07″N 17°42′13″E
- Country: Poland
- Voivodeship: Greater Poland
- County: Ostrów
- Gmina: Sośnie

Kuźnica Kącka (Polish pronunciation: [kuʑˈɲit͡sa ˈkɔnt͡ska]) is a village in the administrative district of Gmina Sośnie, within Ostrów County, Greater Poland Voivodeship, in west-central Poland.
