= Młynik, Gmina Sośnie =

Młynik
- Village
- Location within Poland
- Coordinates: 51°31′N 17°36′E
- Country: Poland
- Voivodeship: Greater Poland
- County: Ostrów
- Gmina: Sośnie

Młynik [ˈmwɨnik] is a village in the administrative district of Gmina Sośnie, within Ostrów County, Greater Poland Voivodeship, in west-central Poland. The area lies approximately 6 kilometres (4 mi) north of Sośnie, 17 km (11 mi) south-west of Ostrów Wielkopolski, and 109 km (68 mi) south-east of the regional capital Poznań.
