= Pawłów, Gmina Sośnie =

Pawłów
- Village
- Location within Poland
- Coordinates: 51°25′N 17°39′E
- Country: Poland
- Voivodeship: Greater Poland
- County: Ostrów
- Gmina: Sośnie

Pawłów [ˈpavwuf] is a village in the administrative district of Gmina Sośnie, within Ostrów County, Greater Poland Voivodeship, in west-central Poland.
