= Bronisławka, Greater Poland Voivodeship =

Bronisławka
- Settlement
- Location within Poland
- Coordinates: 51°27′58″N 17°44′10″E
- Country: Poland
- Voivodeship: Greater Poland
- County: Ostrów
- Gmina: Sośnie

Bronisławka [brɔniˈswafka] is a settlement in the administrative district of Gmina Sośnie, within Ostrów County, Greater Poland Voivodeship, in west-central Poland.
