= Lipskie =

- Village
- Location within Poland
- Coordinates: 51°29′50″N 17°35′55″E
- Country: Poland
- Voivodeship: Greater Poland
- County: Ostrów
- Gmina: Sośnie

Lipskie [ˈlipskʲɛ] is a village in the administrative district of Gmina Sośnie, within Ostrów County, Greater Poland Voivodeship, in west-central Poland.
