= Gmina Krośnice =

Gmina Krośnice Krośnice Commune
- Gmina
- Flag Coat of arms
- Interactive map of Gmina Krośnice
- Coordinates (Krośnice): 51°28′N 17°22′E
- Country: Poland
- Voivodeship: Lower Silesian
- County: Milicz
- Seat: Krośnice
- Sołectwos: Brzostowo, Bukowice, Czarnogoździce, Czeszyce, Dąbrowa, Dziewiętlin, Grabownica, Kotlarka, Krośnice, Kubryk, Kuźnica Czeszycka, Łazy Małe, Łazy Wielkie, Lędzina, Luboradów, Pierstnica, Pierstnica Mała, Police, Stara Huta, Suliradzice, Świebodów, Wąbnice, Wierzchowice, Żeleźniki

Area
  - Total: 178.73 km^{2} (69.01 sq mi)

Population (2019-06-30)
  - Total: 8,151
  - Density: 45.61/km^{2} (118.1/sq mi)
- Website: http://www.krosnice.pl

Gmina Krośnice is a rural gmina (administrative district) in Milicz County, Lower Silesian Voivodeship, in south-western Poland. Its seat is the village of Krośnice, which lies approximately 10 kilometres (6 mi) south-east of Milicz and 45 km (28 mi) north-east of the regional capital Wrocław. It is part of the Wrocław metropolitan area.

The gmina covers an area of 178.73 square kilometres (69.0 sq mi), and as of 2019 its total population is 8,151.

== Neighbouring gminas ==
Gmina Krośnice is bordered by the gminas of Dobroszyce, Milicz, Sośnie, Twardogóra and Zawonia.

== Villages ==
The gmina contains the villages of Brzostówko, Brzostowo, Bukowice, Czarnogoździce, Czeszyce, Dąbrowa, Dziewiętlin, Grabownica, Kotlarka, Krośnice, Kubryk, Kuźnica Czeszycka, Łazy Małe, Łazy Wielkie, Łazy-Poręba, Lędzina, Luboradów, Pierstnica, Pierstnica Mała, Police, Stara Huta, Suliradzice, Świebodów, Wąbnice, Wierzchowice and Żeleźniki.
