= Kopalina, Greater Poland Voivodeship =

Kopalina
- Village
- Location within Poland
- Coordinates: 51°26′7″N 17°34′41″E
- Country: Poland
- Voivodeship: Greater Poland
- County: Ostrów
- Gmina: Sośnie

Kopalina [kɔpaˈlina] is a village in the administrative district of Gmina Sośnie, within Ostrów County, Greater Poland Voivodeship, in west-central Poland.
