= Bogdaj =

- Village
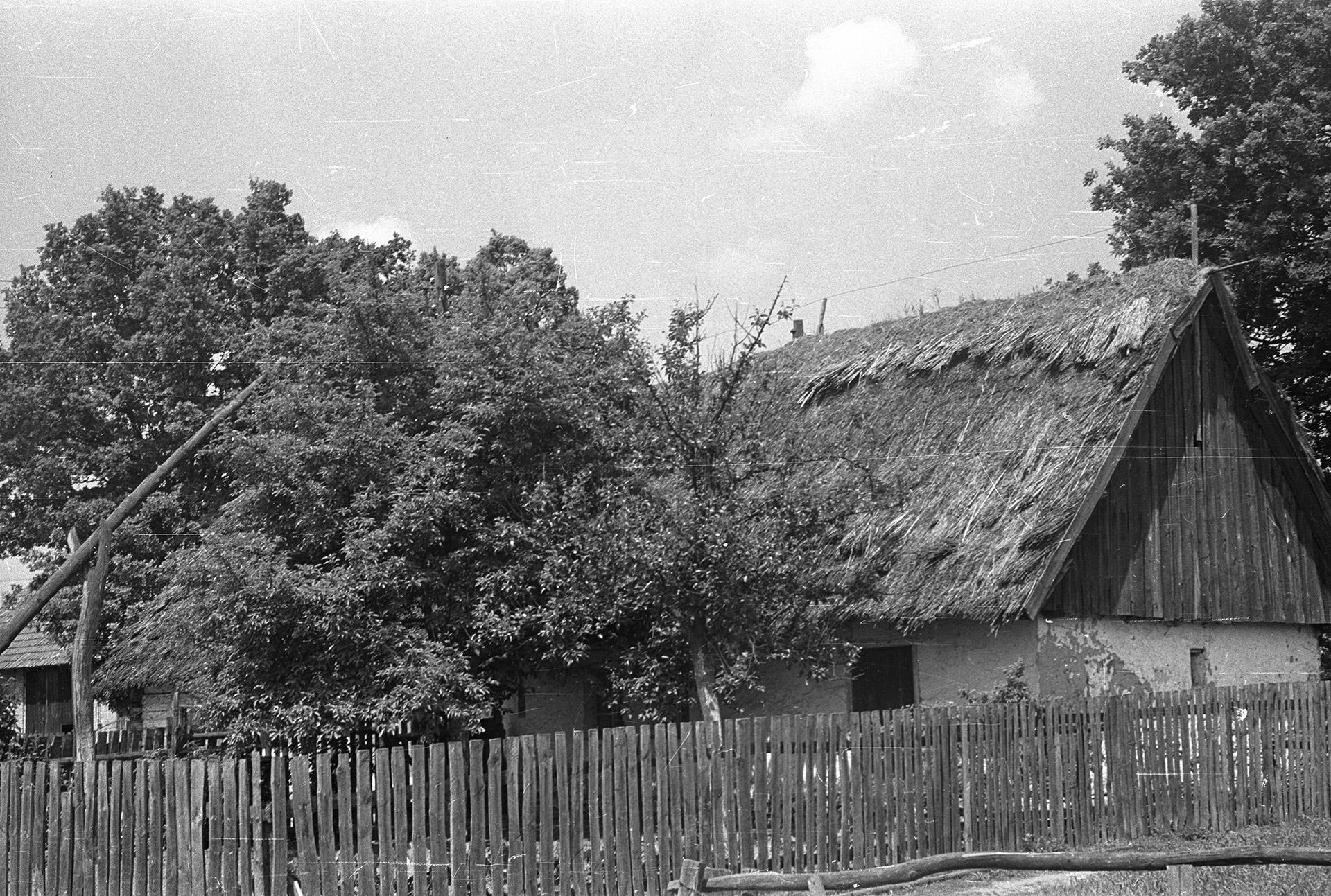

- Location within Poland
- Coordinates: 51°31′10″N 17°33′57″E
- Country: Poland
- Voivodeship: Greater Poland
- County: Ostrów
- Gmina: Sośnie

Bogdaj [ˈbɔɡdai̯] is a village in the administrative district of Gmina Sośnie, within Ostrów County, Greater Poland Voivodeship, in west-central Poland.
