= Janina Szymkowiak =

Polish Roman Catholic un

Blessed Janina Szymkowiak CMBB

Virgin
- Born: 10 July 1910; Możdżanów, Wielkopolskie, Province of Silesia
- Died: 29 August 1942 (aged 32); Poznań, Wielkopolskie, General Government
- Venerated in: Roman Catholic Church
- Beatified: 18 August 2002, Kraków, Poland by Pope John Paul II
- Feast: 29 August

Janina Szymkowiak (10 July 1910 – 29 August 1942), religious name Sancja, was a Polish religious sister from the Daughters of the Sorrowful Mother of God. The nun studied foreign languages and literature before the outbreak that turned into World War II in which her convent was turned into a field hospital for prisoners of war as well as a place to do forced labor for the Nazi soldiers.

The beatification Pope John Paul II beatified her in Poland in August 2002.

== Life ==
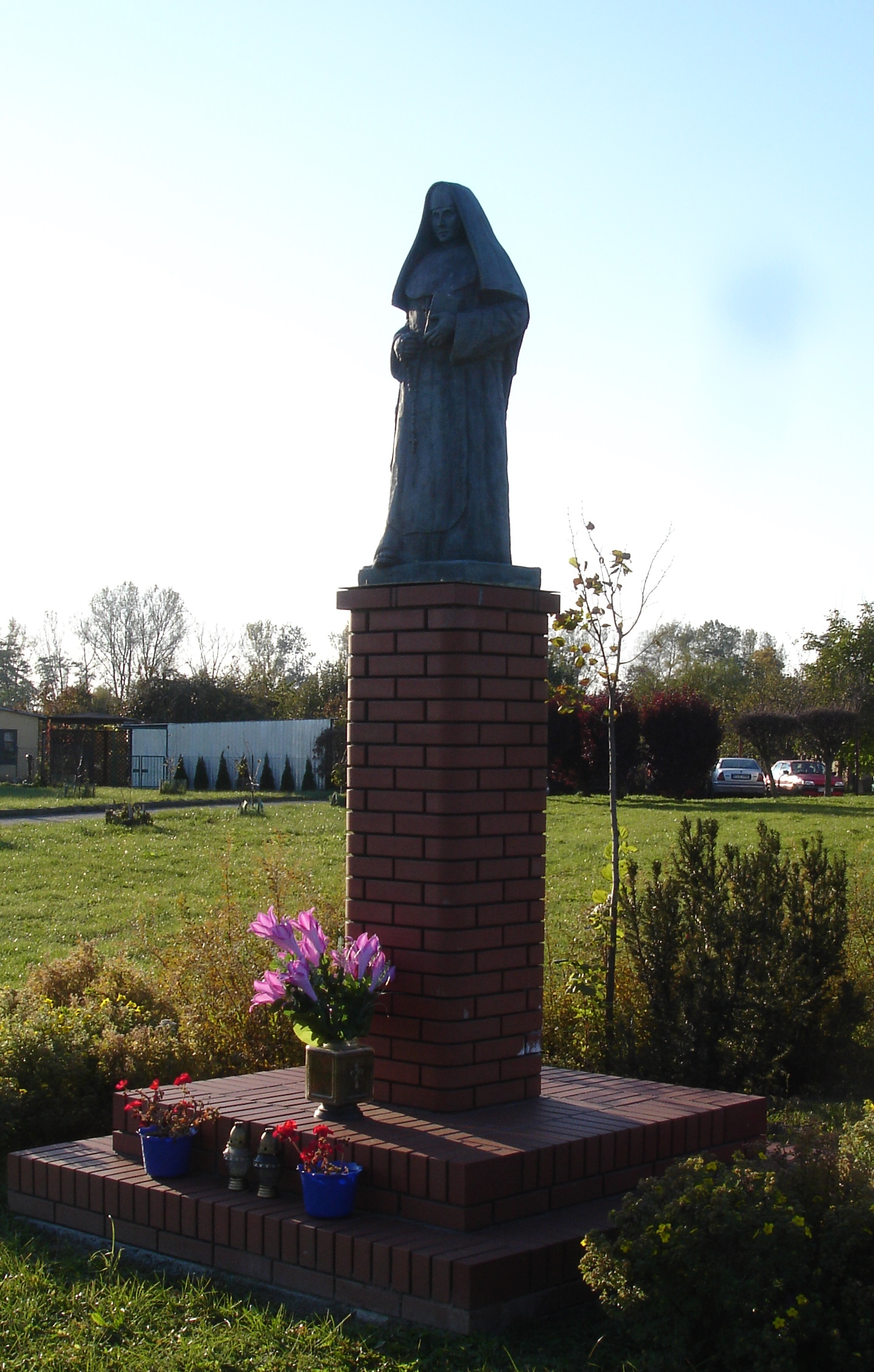
Statue of Sancja Szymkowiak in Pawłowice

Janina Szymkowiak was born in 1910 as the last of five children to Augustine Szymkowiak and Maria Duchalska as their sole daughter. She was baptized not long after in the month of her birth.

Her initial education in a school lasted from 1916 until 1919 and the family relocated in 1921 after her parents bought a house in another city. Following the successful completion of her high school education in 1929 (after passing her examinations in May 1928) she studied several languages in addition to foreign languages at college in Poznań. She became a member of the "Sodality of Mary", where she became well known amongst its members for her personal interest in aiding the poor and in aiding those who were suffering from personal problems to which she found the time to help them with.

In summer 1934 she undertook a pilgrimage to Lourdes where she began to experience the call to the religious life and decided to entrust herself while there to the Blessed Virgin Mary. Until 1935 she spent time with the Congregation of the Oblate Sisters of the Sacred Heart at Montluçon and then returned home in 1936. On 27 June 1936 she became a member of the Daughters of the Sorrowful Mother of God and assumed the religious name Sancja on 29 July 1937. Her mother had once tried to dissuade her daughter from joining the religious life and failed to have her son dissuade her. She became noted for her strong and strict adherence to the rule of the order. Szymkowiak made her initial vows on 30 July 1938 and worked until 1939 in a nursery school where she began to study pharmacology though the outbreak of World War II stopped this.

The Nazi forces invaded Poland on 1 September 1939 and when the town she was in was occupied the invaders ordered them to care for German soldiers in addition to the English and French prisoners of war. Due to her language studies she served as a translator for these prisoners and did all the other forced labor work that the Germans ordered her and the other nuns to do. In February 1940 she was granted permission to go back to her family for a brief visit but she decided instead to remain with her fellow religious.

The nun contracted tuberculosis due to this work but managed to make her solemn profession on 6 July 1942 weeks before she died due to her ailment. She died in the morning of 29 August 1942 after receiving the Eucharist as she requested of her superior.

== Beatification ==
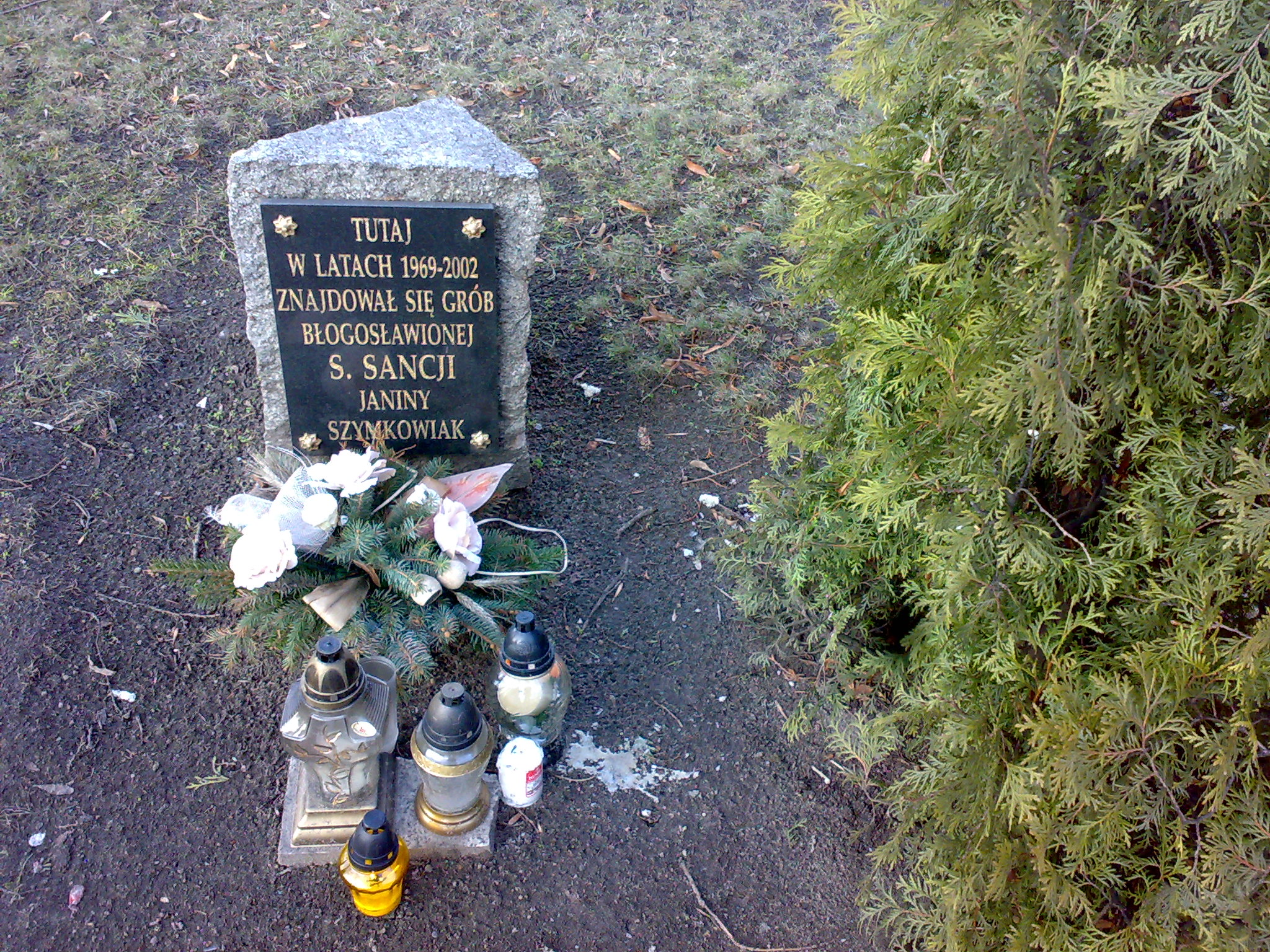
Grave site at the cemetary of St. Roch in Poznan

The beatification process commenced under Pope Paul VI and Szymkowiak was titled as a Servant of God. Archbishop Antoni Baraniak inaugurated the informative process on 24 March 1968; the archbishop's successor, Jerzy Stroba, closed the process on 23 January 1979. The Congregation for the Causes of Saints later validated this process about a decade later on 10 June 1988 and received the official positio dossier from the postulator in 1992.

Theologians met and approved the cause on 16 March 2000 while the members of the Congregation followed suit on 17 October 2000. On 18 December 2000, Szymkowiak was declared as Venerable after Pope John Paul II confirmed her heroic virtue.

A miracle attributed to her intercession was scrutinized in a diocesan process that received validation on 15 June 2001 and the approval of a board of medical experts on 11 April 2002. The pope approved it on 5 July 2002 and beatified Szymkowiak in Kraków on 18 August 2002.
