= Brzostowo, Lower Silesian Voivodeship =

Brzostowo
- Village
- Location within Poland
- Coordinates: 51°26′01″N 17°25′38″E
- Country: Poland
- Voivodeship: Lower Silesian
- County: Milicz
- Gmina: Krośnice

Brzostowo [bʐɔsˈtɔvɔ] is a village in the administrative district of Gmina Krośnice, within Milicz County, Lower Silesian Voivodeship, in south-western Poland.
