= Czarnogoździce =

- Village
- Location within Poland
- Coordinates: 51°29′11″N 17°18′22″E
- Country: Poland
- Voivodeship: Lower Silesian
- County: Milicz
- Gmina: Krośnice

Czarnogoździce ([t͡ʂarnɔɡɔʑˈd͡ʑit͡sɛ]; German: Zwornogoschütz) is a village in the administrative district of Gmina Krośnice, within Milicz County, Lower Silesian Voivodeship, in south-western Poland.
