= Żabnik =

Żabnik may refer to:

- Żabnik, Greater Poland Voivodeship
- Żabnik, Opole Voivodeship
