= Surmin =

- Village
- Location within Poland
- Coordinates: 51°28′38″N 17°39′20″E
- Country: Poland
- Voivodeship: Greater Poland
- County: Ostrów
- Gmina: Sośnie

Surmin [ˈsurmin] is a village in the administrative district of Gmina Sośnie, within Ostrów County, Greater Poland Voivodeship, in west-central Poland.
