= Łazy Małe, Lower Silesian Voivodeship =

Łazy Małe
- Village
- Location within Poland
- Coordinates: 51°24′32″N 17°16′52″E
- Country: Poland
- Voivodeship: Lower Silesian
- County: Milicz
- Gmina: Krośnice

Łazy Małe [ˈwazɨ ˈmawɛ] is a village in the administrative district of Gmina Krośnice, within Milicz County, Lower Silesian Voivodeship, in south-western Poland.
