= Żabnik, Greater Poland Voivodeship =

Żabnik
- Village
- Location within Poland
- Coordinates: 51°31′0″N 17°32′0″E
- Country: Poland
- Voivodeship: Greater Poland
- County: Ostrów
- Gmina: Sośnie
- Elevation: 117 m (384 ft)

Żabnik [ˈʐabnik] is a village in the administrative district of Gmina Sośnie, within Ostrów County, Greater Poland Voivodeship, in west-central Poland.
