= Krośnice, Lower Silesian Voivodeship =

Krośnice
- Village
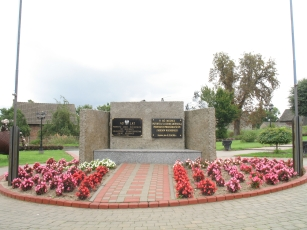

- Location within Poland
- Coordinates: 51°28′N 17°22′E
- Country: Poland
- Voivodeship: Lower Silesian
- County: Milicz
- Gmina: Krośnice
- Population: 1,800

Krośnice ([krɔɕˈnit͡sɛ]) (German: Kraschnitz) is a village in Milicz County, Lower Silesian Voivodeship, in south-western Poland. It is the seat of the administrative district (gmina) called Gmina Krośnice.

Count Adalbert von der Recke had established a Samaritan psychiatric hospital for children here in 1860, modeled after his orphanage in Düsseltal, Rhineland.
