= Chojnik, Greater Poland Voivodeship =

Chojnik
- Village
- Location within Poland
- Coordinates: 51°26′24″N 17°41′57″E
- Country: Poland
- Voivodeship: Greater Poland
- County: Ostrów
- Gmina: Sośnie
- Population (approx.): 300

Chojnik [ˈxɔi̯nik] is a village in the administrative district of Gmina Sośnie, within Ostrów County, Greater Poland Voivodeship, in west-central Poland.

The village has an approximate population of 300. Chojniks former German name was Honig.
