= Žabnik =

Žabnik may refer to:

- Žabnik, Međimurje County, a village in northern Croatia
- Žabnik, Varaždin County, a village near Trnovec Bartolovečki in northern Croatia
