= Sośnie =

- Village
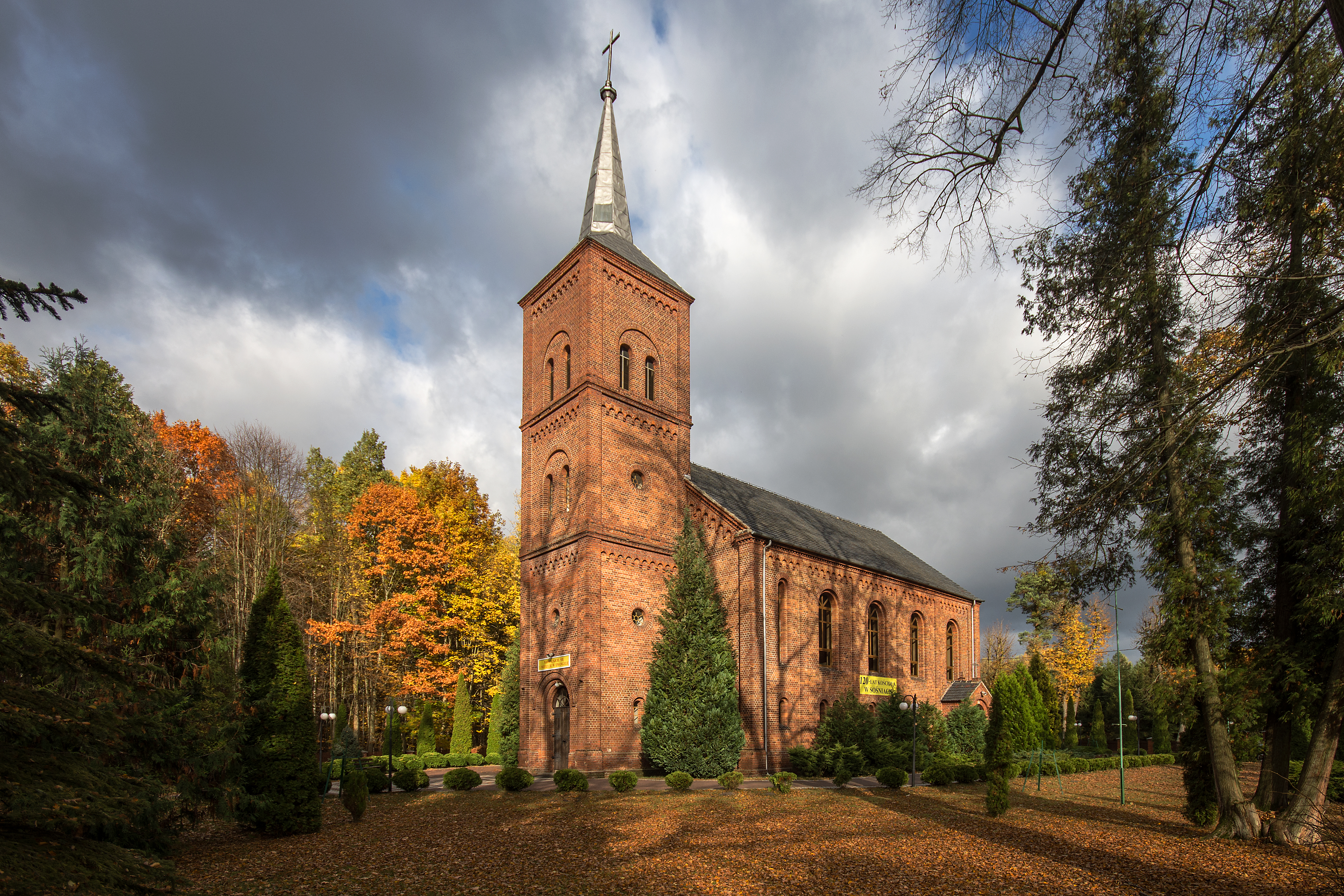
- Church of the Nativity of the Virgin Mary

- Location within Poland
- Coordinates: 51°28′N 17°37′E
- Country: Poland
- Voivodeship: Greater Poland
- County: Ostrów
- Gmina: Sośnie
- Elevation: 129 m (423 ft)

Population (approx.)
  - Total: 1,000

Sośnie ([ˈsɔɕɲɛ]) (German: Suschen) is a village in Ostrów County, Greater Poland Voivodeship, in west-central Poland. It is the seat of the gmina (administrative district) called Gmina Sośnie.

The village has an approximate population of 1,000.
