= Kuźnica Czeszycka =

- Village
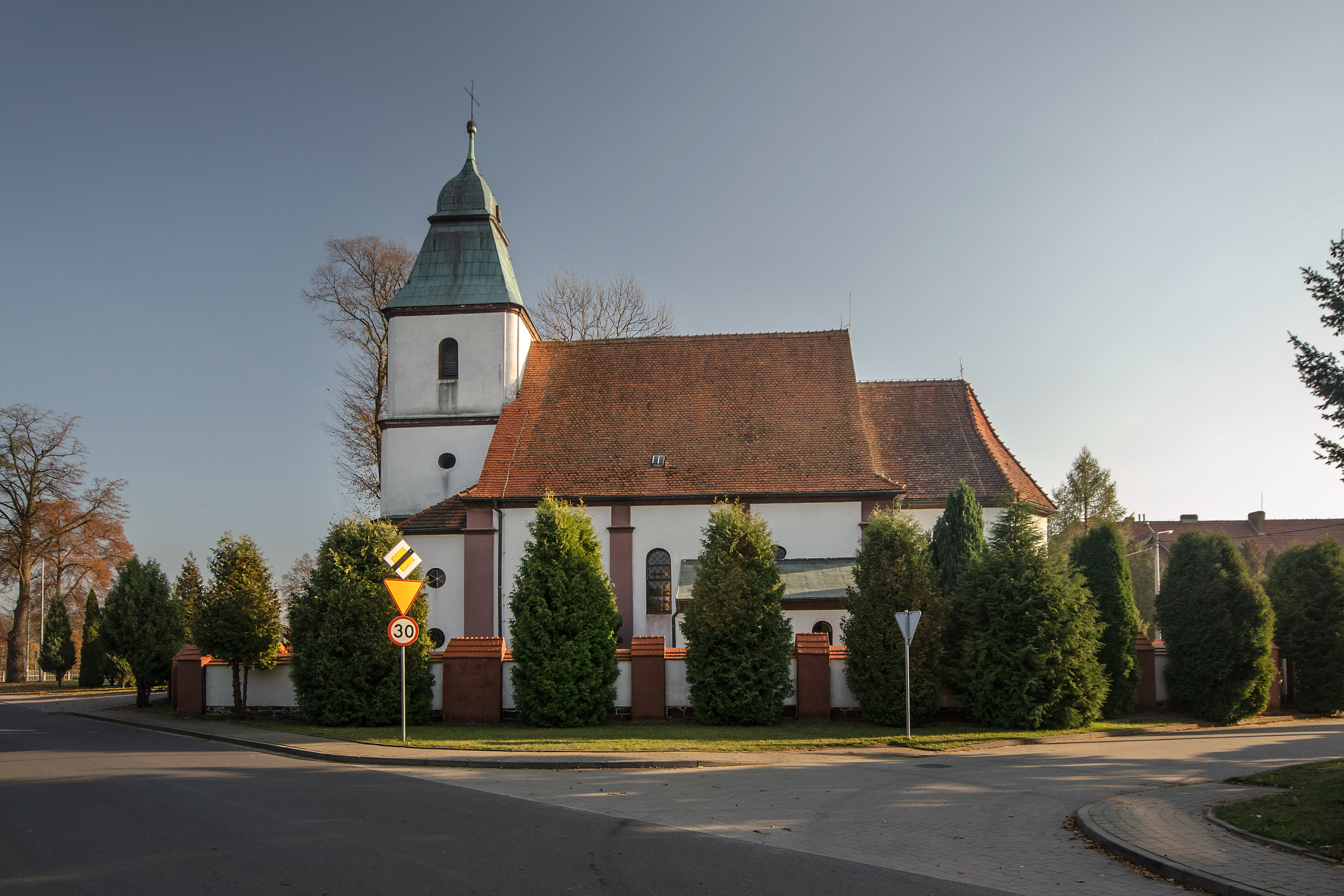
- Catholic church

- Location within Poland
- Coordinates: 51°29′30″N 17°28′38″E
- Country: Poland
- Voivodeship: Lower Silesian
- County: Milicz
- Gmina: Krośnice
- Population: 270

Kuźnica Czeszycka (Polish: [kuʑˈɲit͡sa t͡ʂɛˈʂɨt͡ska]) is a village in the administrative district of Gmina Krośnice, within Milicz County, Lower Silesian Voivodeship, in south-western Poland.
