= Grabownica, Gmina Krośnice =

Grabownica
- Village
- Location within Poland
- Coordinates: 51°28′02″N 17°27′45″E
- Country: Poland
- Voivodeship: Lower Silesian
- County: Milicz
- Gmina: Krośnice

Grabownica ([ɡrabɔvˈnit͡sa]; German: Charlottenthal) is a village in the administrative district of Gmina Krośnice, within Milicz County, Lower Silesian Voivodeship, in south-western Poland.
