= Czesławice, Gmina Sośnie =

Czesławice
- Village
- Location within Poland
- Coordinates: 51°28′45″N 17°33′34″E
- Country: Poland
- Voivodeship: Greater Poland
- County: Ostrów
- Gmina: Sośnie

Czesławice (Polish pronunciation: [t͡ʂɛswaˈvit͡sɛ]) is a village in the administrative district of Gmina Sośnie, within Ostrów County, Greater Poland Voivodeship, in west-central Poland.
