= Kąty Śląskie =

- Village
- Location within Poland
- Coordinates: 51°24′N 17°42′E
- Country: Poland
- Voivodeship: Greater Poland
- County: Ostrów
- Gmina: Sośnie
- Population: 120
- Website: http://katyslaskie.dbv.pl

Kąty Śląskie [ˈkɔntɨ ˈɕlɔ̃skʲɛ] is a village in the administrative district of Gmina Sośnie, within Ostrów County, Greater Poland Voivodeship, in west-central Poland.
