= Granowiec =

- Village
- Location within Poland
- Coordinates: 51°30′N 17°39′E
- Country: Poland
- Voivodeship: Greater Poland
- County: Ostrów
- Gmina: Sośnie
- Elevation: 128 m (420 ft)
- Population (approx.): 1,360

Granowiec [ɡraˈnɔvjɛt͡s] is a village in the administrative district of Gmina Sośnie, within Ostrów County, Greater Poland Voivodeship, in west-central Poland.
