= Anielin =

Anielin may refer to a number of places in Poland:

== Kuyavian-Pomeranian Voivodeship (north-central Poland) ==
- Anielin, Nakło County
- Anielin, Włocławek County

== Lublin Voivodeship (east Poland) ==
- Anielin, Kraśnik County
- Anielin, Puławy County

== Łódź Voivodeship (central Poland) ==
- Anielin, Kutno County
- Anielin, Łask County
- Anielin, Opoczno County
- Anielin, Radomsko County
- Anielin, Wieluń County
- Anielin, Zgierz County

== Masovian Voivodeship (east-central Poland) ==
- Anielin, Ciechanów County
- Anielin, Gostynin County
- Anielin, Grójec County
- Anielin, Gmina Garbatka-Letnisko
- Anielin, Gmina Magnuszew
- Anielin, Płońsk County
- Anielin, Radom County

== Greater Poland Voivodeship (west-central Poland) ==
- Anielin, Kalisz County
- Anielin, Złotów County

== See also ==
- Anielin Swędowski in Zgierz County, Łódź Voivodeship
- Anielinek in Mińsk County, Masovian Voivodeship)
- Anielino in Łobez County, West Pomeranian Voivodeship
- Anieliny in Nakło County, Kuyavian-Pomeranian Voivodeship
