= Ciolek =

Ciolek or Ciołek may refer to:

== People ==
- Erazm Ciołek (disambiguation), multiple people with the name
- Gerald Ciolek (born 1986), German cyclist
- Gerard Antoni Ciołek (1909–1966), Polish architect
- Włodzimierz Ciołek (born 1956), Polish footballer

== Other ==
- Ciołek coat of arms
- Ciołek, Łódź Voivodeship, village in central Poland
