= Zagłoba =

Zagłoba may refer to:

- Onufry Zagłoba, a fictional Polish noble
- Zagłoba coat of arms, a Polish coat of arms
- Zagłoba, Łódź Voivodeship (central Poland)
- Zagłoba, Lublin Voivodeship (east Poland)

without a diacritic mark, it may refer to:

- Zagloba (beetle), a genus of ladybugs
