= Wola Błędowska =

Wola Błędowska may refer to either of these villages in Masovian Voivodeship, Poland:

- Wola Błędowska, Gmina Pomiechówek, Nowy Dwór County
- Wola Błędowska, Ostrołęka County

== See also ==
- Wola Błędowa
