= Gmina Stryków =

Gmina Stryków Stryków Commune
- Gmina
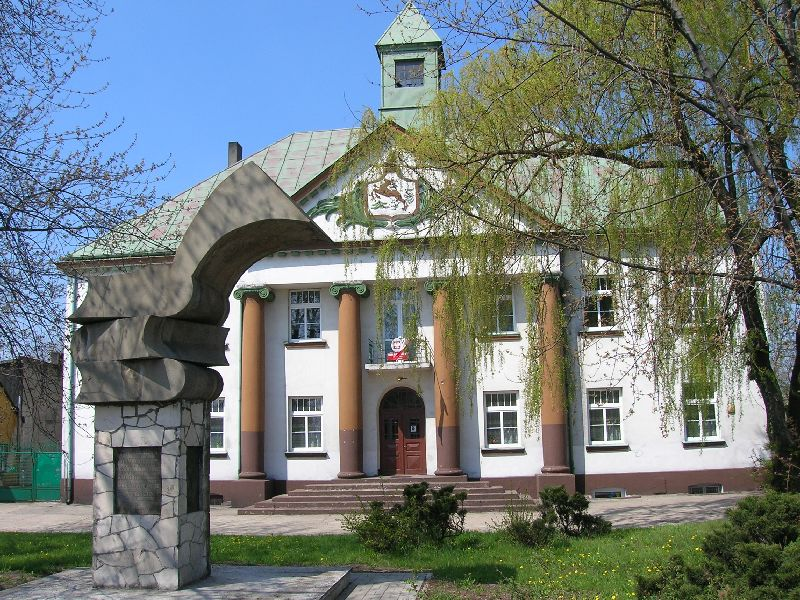

- Coat of arms
- Interactive map of Gmina Stryków
- Coordinates (Stryków): 51°54′4″N 19°36′39″E
- Country: Poland
- Voivodeship: Łódź
- County: Zgierz
- Seat: Stryków

Area
  - Total: 157.84 km^{2} (60.94 sq mi)

Population (2006)
  - Total: 12,120
  - Density: 76.79/km^{2} (198.9/sq mi)
  - Urban: 3,566
  - Rural: 8,554
- Website: www.strykow.pl

Gmina Stryków is an urban-rural gmina (administrative district) in Zgierz County, Łódź Voivodeship, in central Poland. Its seat is the town of Stryków, which lies approximately 15 kilometres (9 mi) north-east of Zgierz and 17 km (11 mi) north-east of the regional capital Łódź.

The gmina covers an area of 157.84 square kilometres (60.9 sq mi), and as of 2006 its total population is 12,120 (of which the population of Stryków is 3,566, and the population of the rural part of the gmina is 8,554).

The gmina contains part of the protected area called Łódź Hills Landscape Park.

== Villages ==
Apart from the town of Stryków, Gmina Stryków contains the villages and settlements of:

- Anielin
- Anielin Swędowski
- Bartolin
- Bratoszewice
- Bronin
- Cesarka
- Ciołek
- Dobieszków
- Dobra
- Dobra-Nowiny
- Gozdów
- Kalinów
- Kiełmina
- Klęk
- Koźle
- Krucice
- Lipa
- Lipka
- Ługi
- Michałówek
- Niesułków
- Niesułków-Kolonia
- Nowostawy Górne
- Orzechówek
- Osse
- Pludwiny
- Rokitnica
- Sadówka
- Sierżnia
- Smolice
- Sosnowiec
- Sosnowiec-Pieńki
- Stary Imielnik
- Swędów
- Tymianka
- Warszewice
- Wola Błędowa
- Wrzask
- Wyskoki
- Zagłoba
- Zelgoszcz

== Neighbouring gminas ==
Gmina Stryków is bordered by the towns of Głowno and Łódź, and by the gminas of Brzeziny, Dmosin, Głowno, Nowosolna and Zgierz.
