= Tymianka =

Tymianka may refer to the following places:

- Tymianka, Łódź Voivodeship (central Poland)
- Tymianka, Masovian Voivodeship (east-central Poland)
- Tymianka, Podlaskie Voivodeship (north-east Poland)
