= Bratoszewice =

- Village
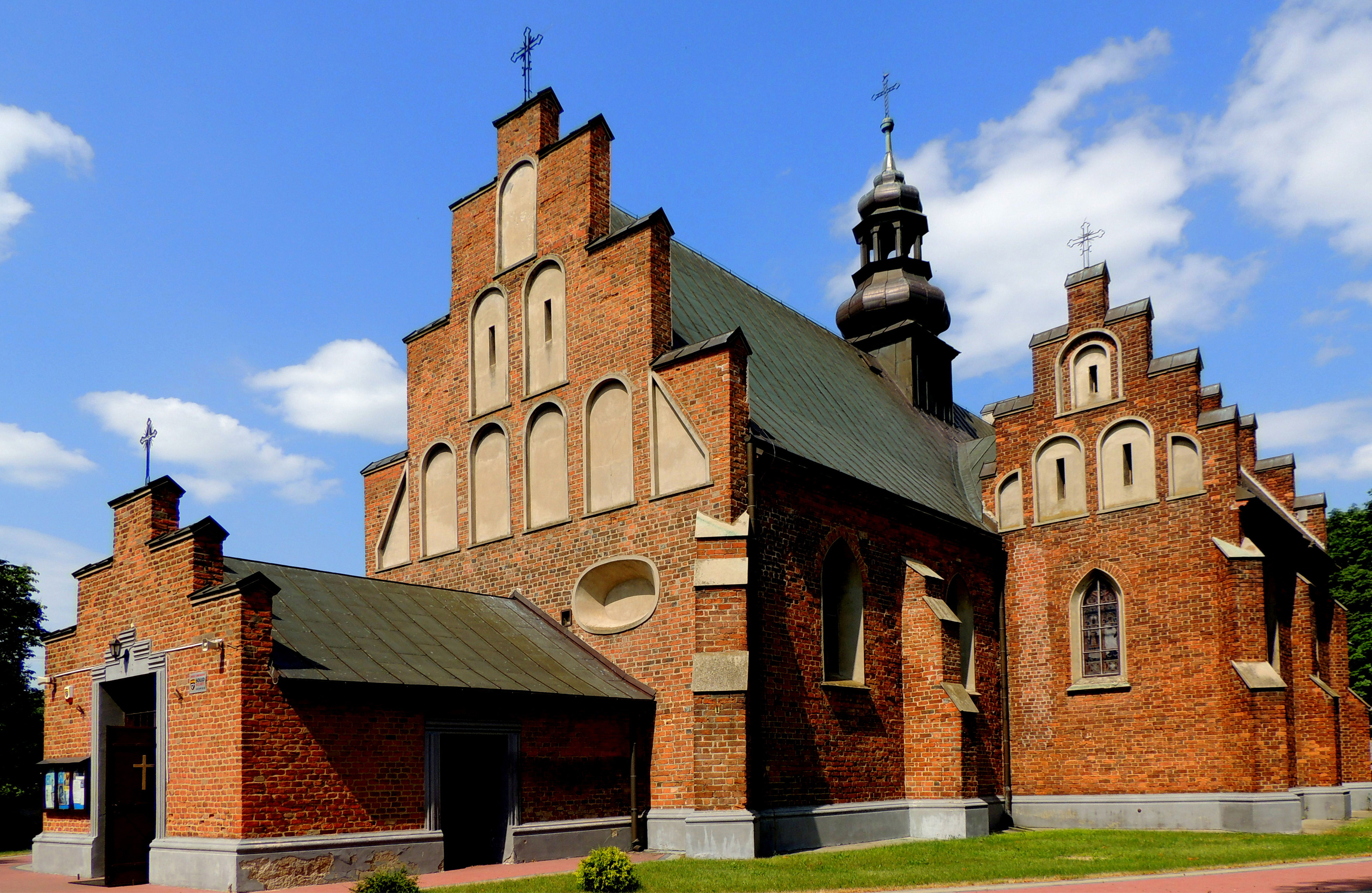
- Saint Augustinus church Bratoszewice

- Location within Poland
- Coordinates: 51°56′N 19°40′E
- Country: Poland
- Voivodeship: Łódź
- County: Zgierz
- Gmina: Stryków

Population
  - Total: 1,100
- Time zone: UTC+1 (CET)
  - Summer (DST): UTC+2 (CEST)
- Vehicle registration: EZG

Bratoszewice [bratɔʂɛˈvit͡sɛ] is a village in the administrative district of Gmina Stryków, within Zgierz County, Łódź Voivodeship, in central Poland. It is located in Łęczyca Land.

== History ==
It was a private town, administratively located in the Brzeziny County in the Łęczyca Voivodeship in the Greater Poland Province of the Kingdom of Poland.

=== Level crossing crash ===
On 30 July 2012 at about 6:00am (0400 GMT) nine people were killed and one seriously injured after a train and a minibus collided at an unguarded railway level crossing in Bratoszewice. There were ten people in the minibus, mostly seasonal workers from Ukraine. Passengers on the train were uninjured.
