= Wrzask =

- Village
- Location within Poland
- Coordinates: 51°57′31″N 19°33′23″E
- Country: Poland
- Voivodeship: Łódź
- County: Zgierz
- Gmina: Stryków
- Population: 60

Wrzask [vʐask] is a village in the administrative district of Gmina Stryków, within Zgierz County, Łódź Voivodeship, in central Poland. Before 2023 it was a part of Gozdów.
