= Warszewice =

Warszewice may refer to the following places in Poland:

- Warszewice, Kuyavian-Pomeranian Voivodeship
- Warszewice, Łódź Voivodeship
