= Łęczyca Land =

Historical region in Poland

Łęczyca Land Ziemia łęczycka
- Historical region
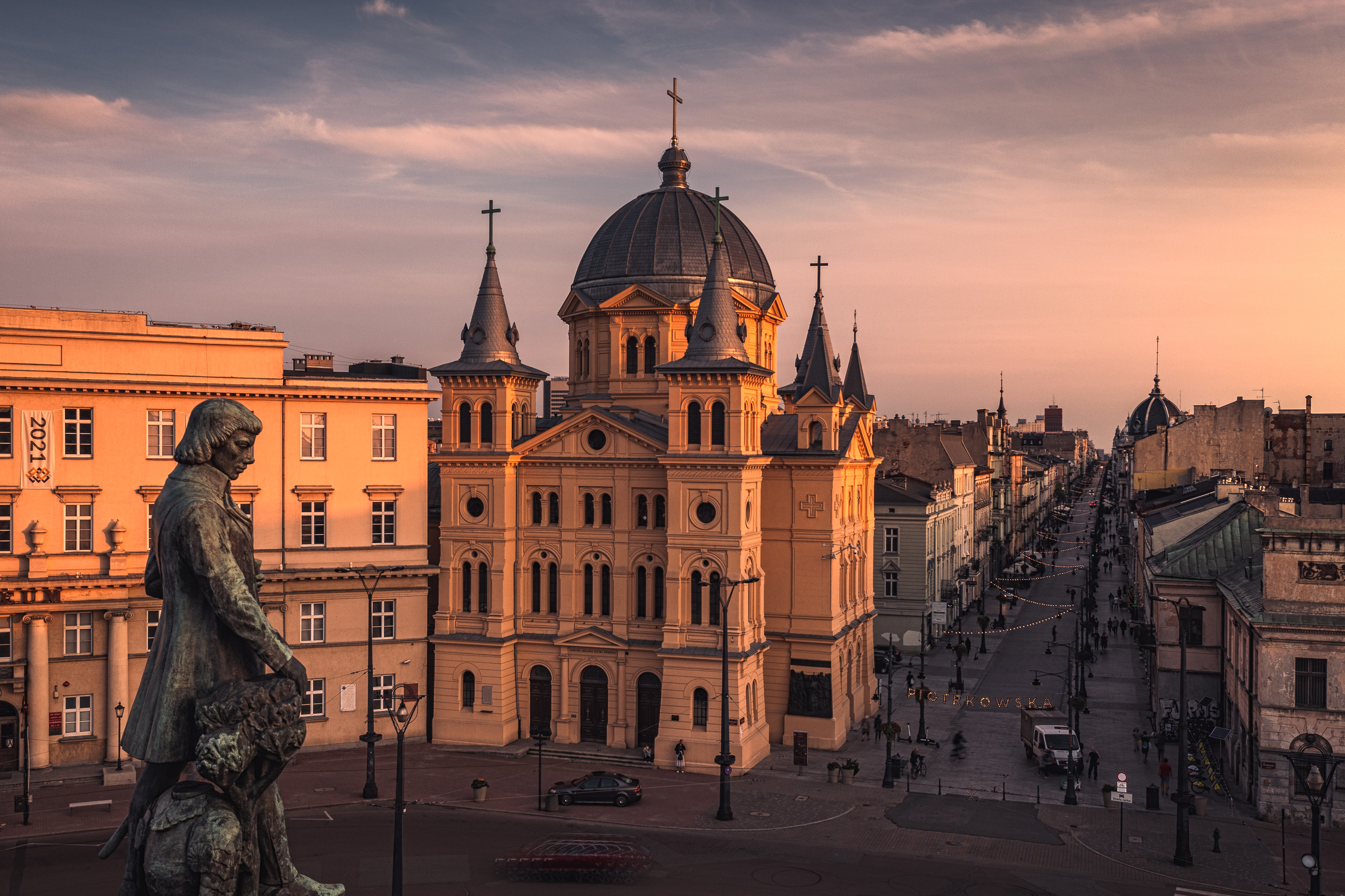
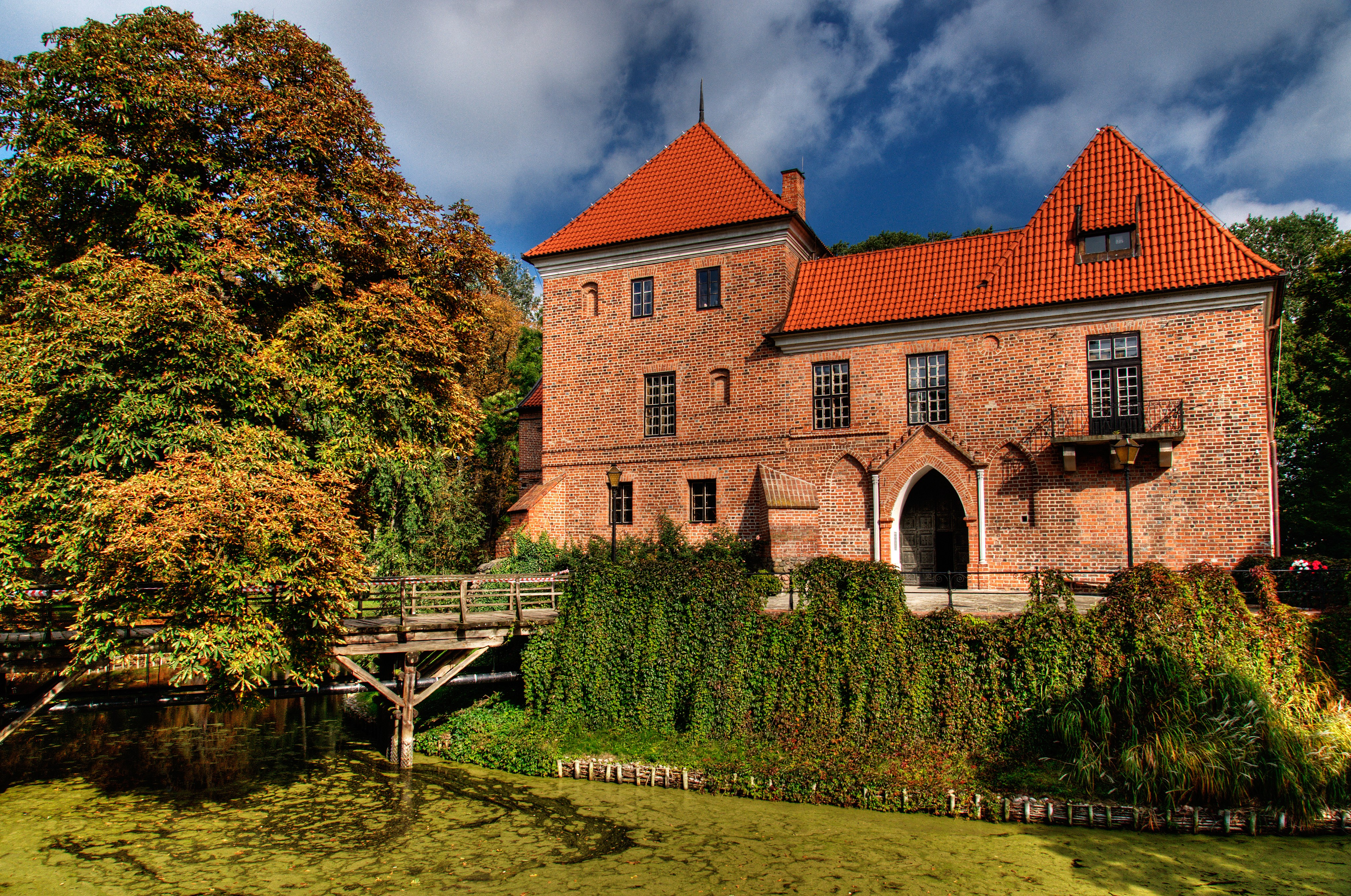
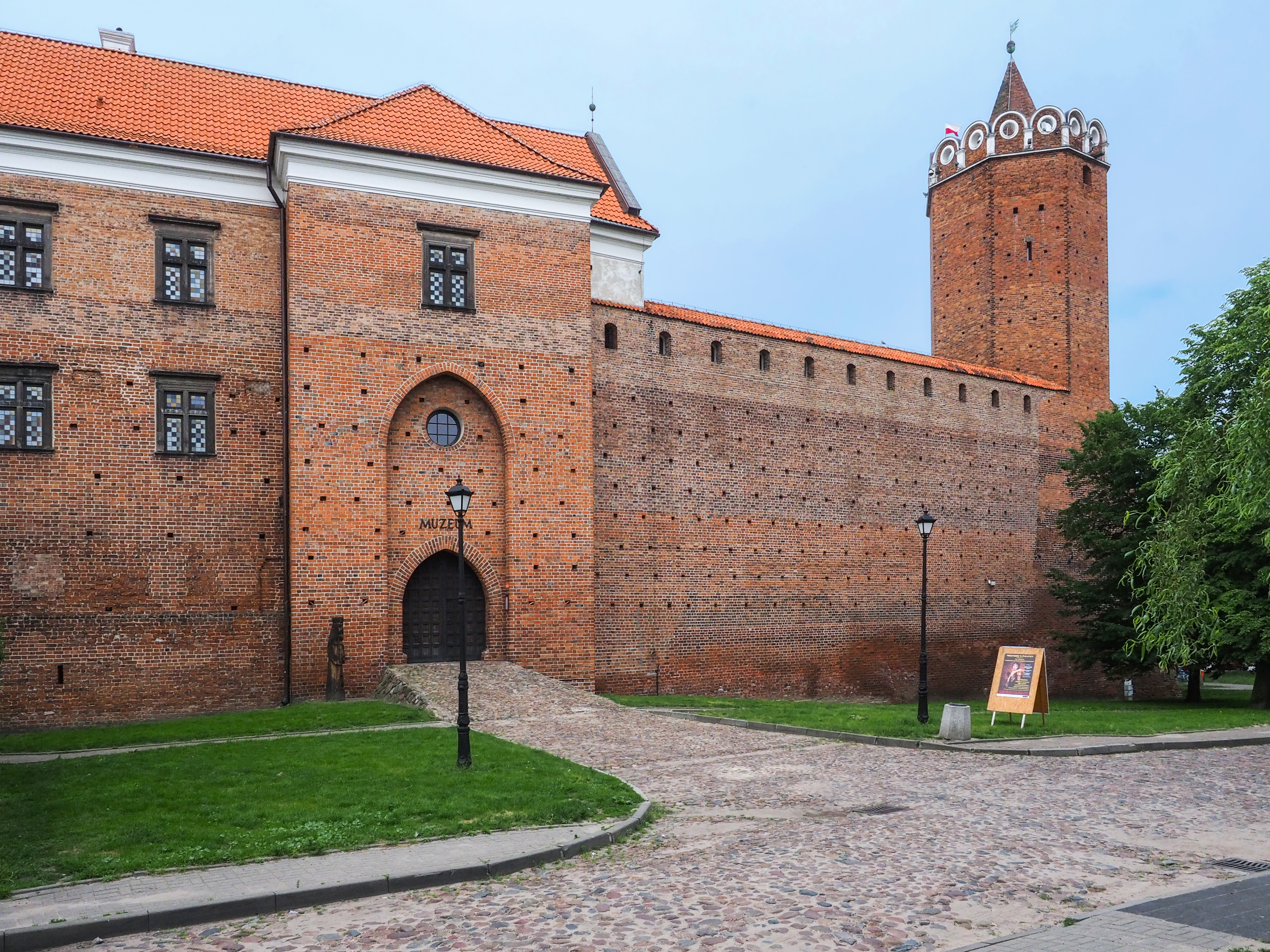
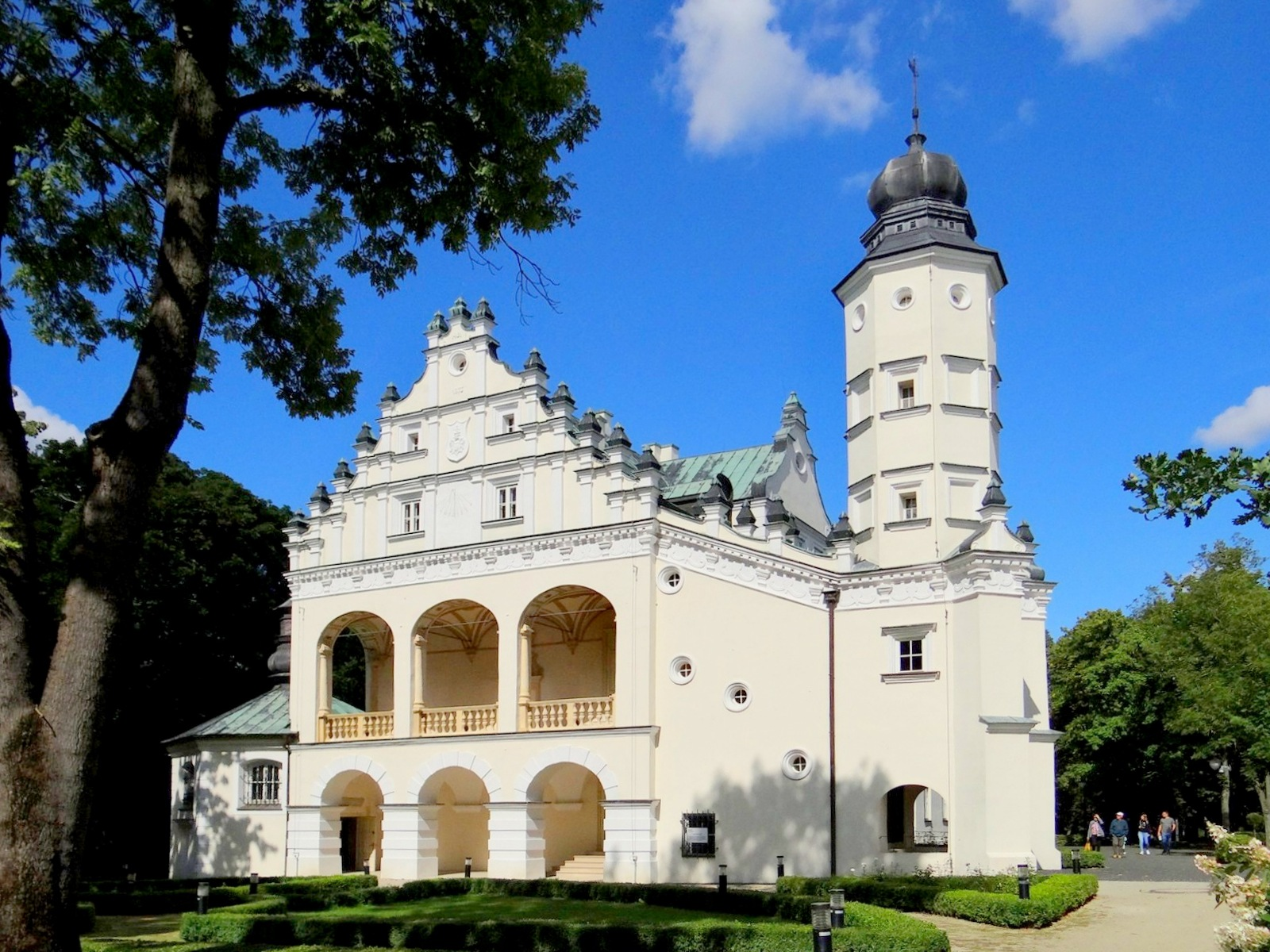
- Łódź city center Oporów Castle Łęczyca Royal Castle Poddębice Palace

- Coat of arms

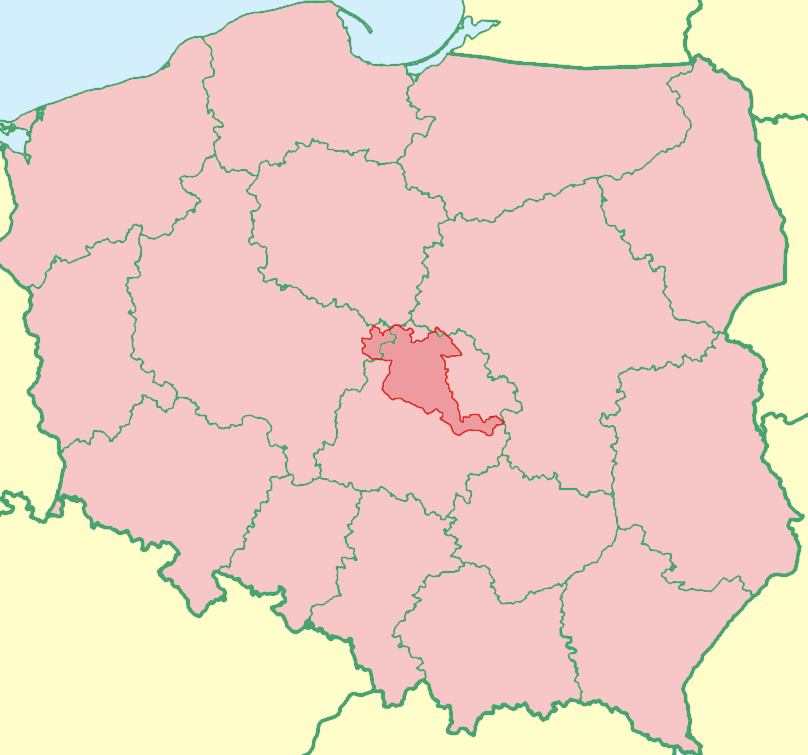
- Łęczyca Land on the map of Poland
- Country: Poland
- Historical capital: Łęczyca
- Largest city: Łódź
- Time zone: UTC+1 (CET)
  - Summer (DST): UTC+2 (CEST)

Łęczyca Land (Polish: ziemia łęczycka; Latin: Terra Lanciciensis) is a historical region in central Poland, a part of Łęczyca-Sieradz Land (Polish: ziemia łęczycko-sieradzka).

Its historical capital is Łęczyca, while the largest city is Łódź, while other bigger cities are Zgierz, and Tomaszów Mazowiecki (partly in Sieradz Land).

Łęczyca Land is bordered by Greater Poland in the west, Kuyavia in the north, Mazovia in the north-east, Lesser Poland in the south-east, and Sieradz Land in the south. It lies at the Bzura and on the north-east banks of Ner rivers.

The Łęczyca Land and Sieradz Land combined roughly correspond with present-day Łódź Voivodeship.

== History ==
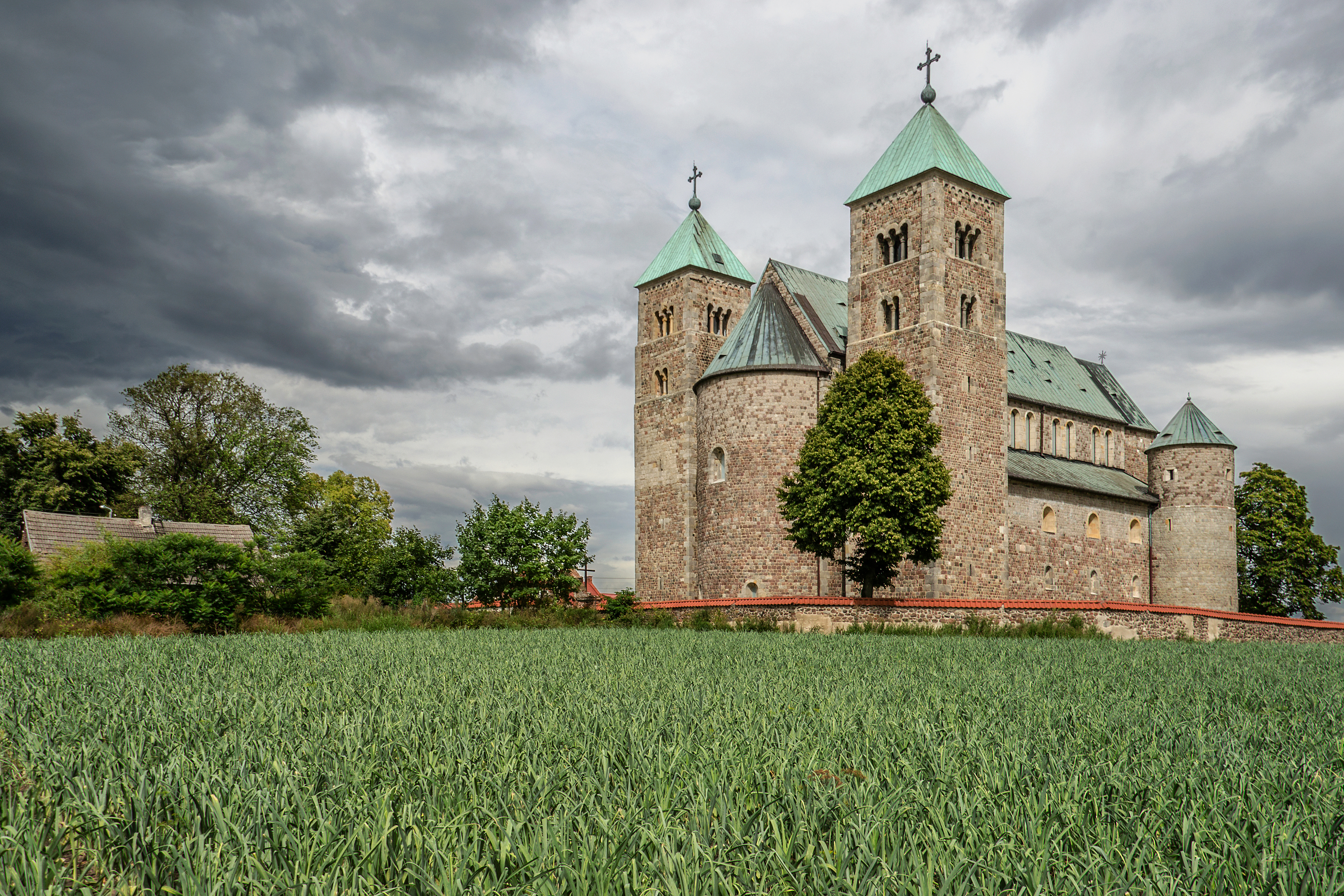
Romanesque Tum Collegiate Church

Łęczyca Land formed part of Poland since the establishment of the state in the 10th century. The main center of the area was Łęczyca, and among other oldest medieval towns were Brzeziny, Inowłódz, Orłów and Piątek. Following the fragmentation of Poland into smaller provincial duchies, it initially formed part of the Seniorate Province, before the Duchy of Łęczyca was established in 1231. Later on, it would be become the Łęczyca Voivodeship in Greater Poland Province in the re-unified Kingdom of Poland. The voivodeships was divided into the three counties of Brzeziny, Łęczyca and Orłów.

During the Industrial Revolution, textile manufactures were founded in Ozorków, Aleksandrów Łódzki, Stryków, Konstantynów Łódzki, Zgierz and Łódź between 1807 and 1823. The population of Łódź then grew tremendously and surpassed other cities of the region.

During the German invasion of Poland, which started World War II in September 1939, German troops committed several massacres of Polish civilians in the region, including at Koźle, Łęczyca, Bądków, Kowalewice, Łagiewniki (present-day district of Łódź) and Sadówka (see Nazi crimes against the Polish nation). Afterwards, the region was occupied by Germany until 1945, and its Polish and Jewish population was subjected to various crimes, including deportation to forced labour, expulsions and mass murder. Major sites of massacres of Poles during the occupation were Łagiewniki and Lućmierz-Las. In Łódź, the Germans established the Łódź Ghetto, the second-largest ghetto for Jews in German-occupied Europe, the infamous Radogoszcz prison, a racial research camp for expelled Poles, and a concentration camp for kidnapped Polish children of two to 16 years of age from various parts of occupied Poland. In the racial research camp, Poles were subjected to racial selection before deportation to forced labour in Germany, and Polish children were taken from their parents and sent to Germanisation camps. The camp for kidnapped children served as a forced labour, penal and internment camp and racial research center, with the children subjected to starvation, exhausting labour, beating even up to death and diseases, and the camp was nicknamed "little Auschwitz" due to its conditions.

== Language ==
The Polish language of the inhabitants of the Łęczyca Land (along with that of the Sieradz Land) is considered the closest to the Polish literary language, as the region did not develop its own dialect, but was a place of blending of dialects from the neighboring larger regions of Greater Poland, Lesser Poland and Mazovia.

== Cities and towns ==
- Aleksandrów Łódzki
- Brzeziny
- Dąbie
- Dąbrowice
- Grabów
- Inowłódz
- Kłodawa
- Koluszki
- Konstantynów Łódzki
- Krośniewice
- Łęczyca
- Łódź
- Ozorków
- Parzęczew
- Piątek
- Poddębice
- Stryków
- Ujazd
- Zgierz
- Żychlin

== Bibliography ==
- Koter, Marek (2016). "Historyczno-geograficzne podstawy oraz proces kształtowania się regionu łódzkiego". In Marszał, Tomasz (ed.). Miasto–region–gospodarka w badaniach geograficznych (in Polish). Łódź: Wydawnictwo Uniwersytetu Łódzkiego. ISBN 978-83-8088-004-7.
