= Viridigloba imitator =

Scientific classification
- Kingdom: Animalia
- Phylum: Arthropoda
- Clade: Pancrustacea
- Class: Insecta
- Order: Coleoptera
- Suborder: Polyphaga
- Infraorder: Cucujiformia
- Family: Coccinellidae
- Genus: Viridigloba
- Species: V. imitator

Binomial name
- Viridigloba imitator Gordon, 1978

Species of beetle

Viridigloba imitator is a species of beetle of the family Coccinellidae. It is found in Trinidad.

== Description ==
Adults reach a length of about 2–2.3 mm (0.079–0.091 in). The elytron is dark metallic green, while the head, pronotum and legs are reddish yellow.

== Etymology ==
The species name refers to the similarity to Zagloba aeneipennis.
