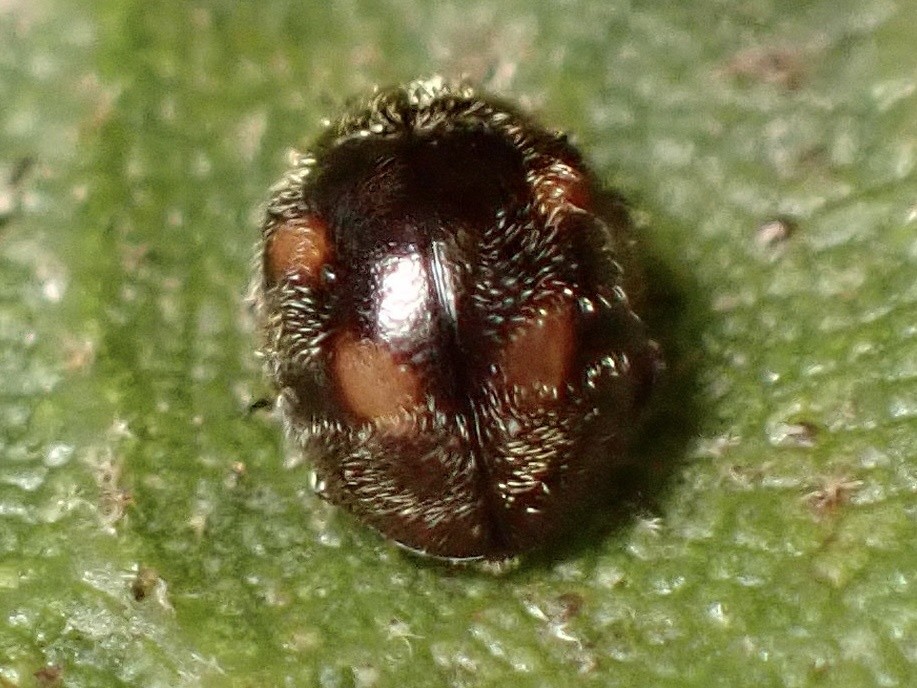

Scientific classification
- Kingdom: Animalia
- Phylum: Arthropoda
- Clade: Pancrustacea
- Class: Insecta
- Order: Coleoptera
- Suborder: Polyphaga
- Infraorder: Cucujiformia
- Family: Coccinellidae
- Genus: Zagloba
- Species: Z. ornata

Binomial name
- Zagloba ornata (Horn, 1895)

Synonyms
- Cephaloscymnus ornatus Horn, 1895; Zagloba laticollis Casey, 1899; Zagloba orbipennis Casey, 1899

= Zagloba ornata =

Species of beetle

Zagloba ornata is a species of lady beetle in the family Coccinellidae. It is found in North America, where it has been recorded from southern Arizona and California to southwestern Oregon.

== Description ==
Adults reach a length of about 1.75-2 mm. They have a dark brown to light brown body, while the antennae, mouthparts and legs are yellowish brown. The pronotum often has yellowish brown lateral areas and the elytron usually has two yellow spots.
