= Lipka, Łódź Voivodeship =

Lipka
- Village
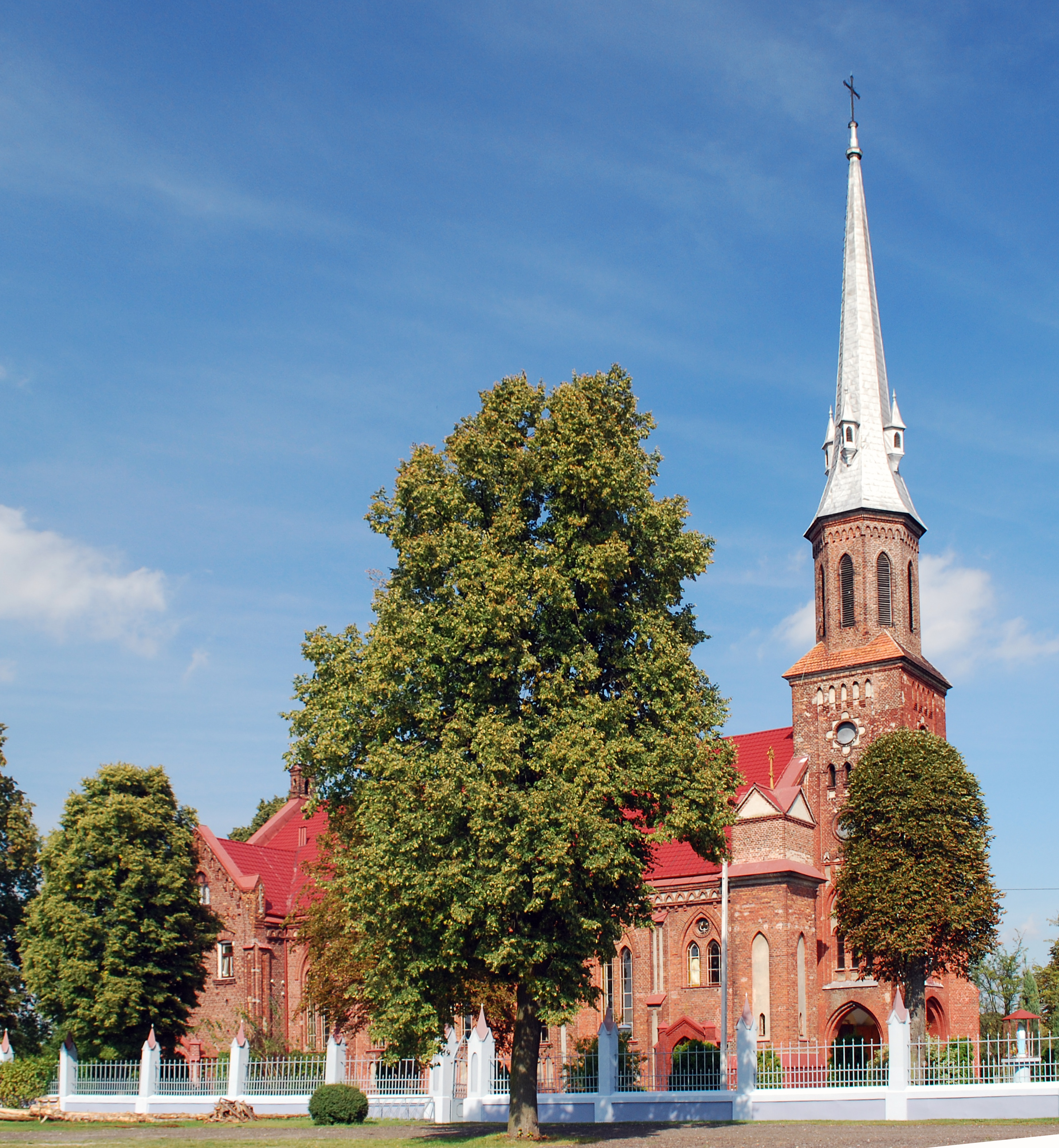
- Catholic church

- Location within Poland
- Coordinates: 51°52′40″N 19°40′20″E
- Country: Poland
- Voivodeship: Łódź
- County: Zgierz
- Gmina: Stryków

Lipka [ˈlipka] is a village in the administrative district of Gmina Stryków, within Zgierz County, Łódź Voivodeship, in central Poland.
