= Osse, Łódź Voivodeship =

Osse
- Village
- Location within Poland
- Coordinates: 51°56′N 19°33′E
- Country: Poland
- Voivodeship: Łódź
- County: Zgierz
- Gmina: Stryków

Osse [ˈɔssɛ] is a village in the administrative district of Gmina Stryków, within Zgierz County, Łódź Voivodeship, in central part of Poland.
