= Viridigloba =

Scientific classification
- Kingdom: Animalia
- Phylum: Arthropoda
- Clade: Pancrustacea
- Class: Insecta
- Order: Coleoptera
- Suborder: Polyphaga
- Infraorder: Cucujiformia
- Family: Coccinellidae
- Tribe: Coccidulini
- Genus: Viridigloba; Gordon, 1978

Genus of insects

Viridigloba is a genus of beetles belonging to the family Coccinellidae.

== Species ==
- Viridigloba imitator Gordon, 1978
