= Swędów =

- Village
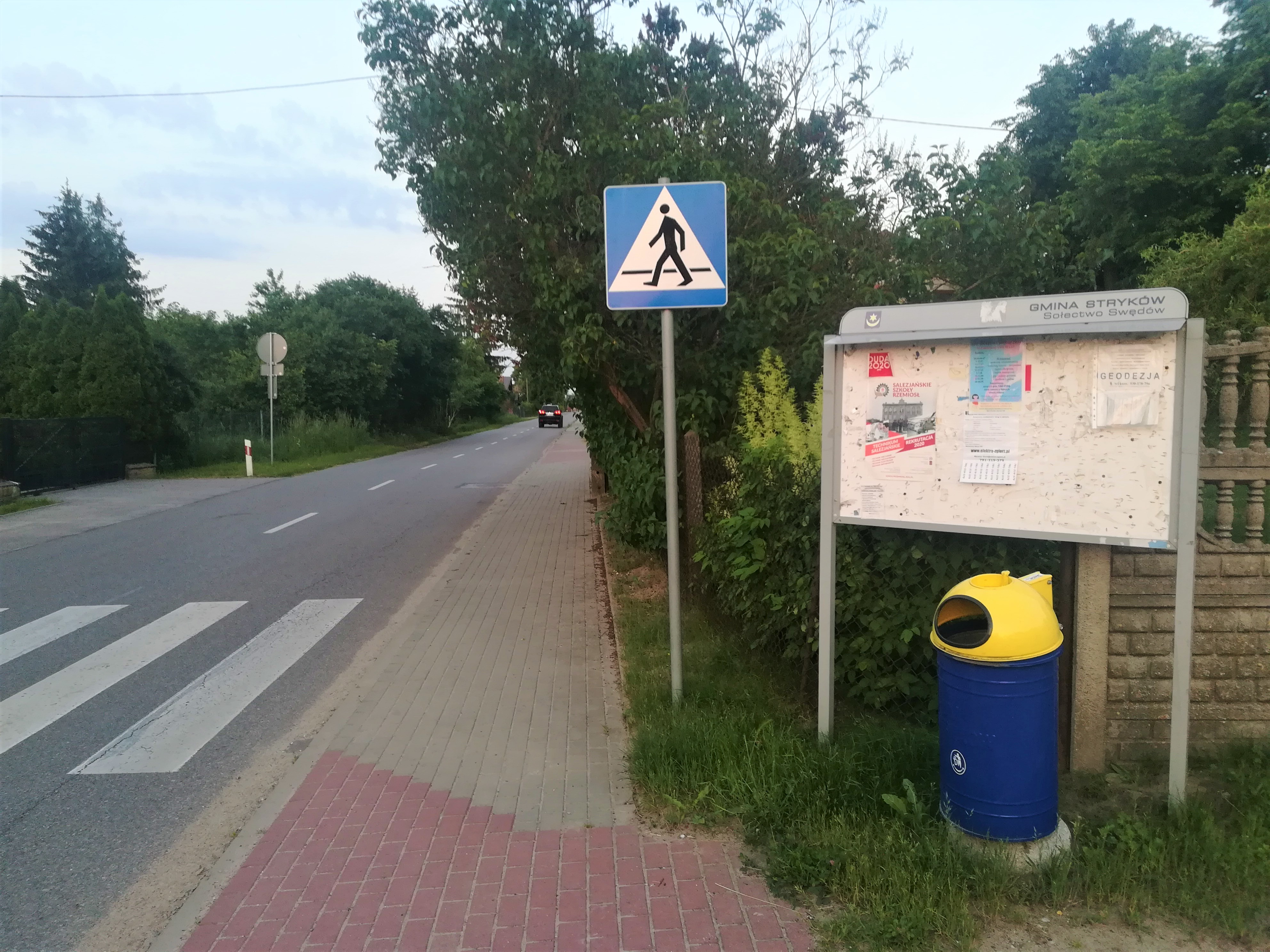

- Location within Poland
- Coordinates: 51°55′N 19°33′E
- Country: Poland
- Voivodeship: Łódź
- County: Zgierz
- Gmina: Stryków
- Population (approx.): 1,000

Swędów (Polish pronunciation: [ˈsfɛnduf]) is a village in the administrative district of Gmina Stryków, within Zgierz County, Łódź Voivodeship, in central Poland.

The village has an approximate population of 1,000.

Swędów mainly consists of holiday homes which people from nearby Łódź come to for the summer.
