= Stryków =

Town in Łódź Voivodeship, Poland

- Saint Martin church in Stryków

- Flag Coat of arms

- Location within Poland
- Coordinates: 51°54′4″N 19°36′39″E
- Country: Poland
- Voivodeship: Łódź
- County: Zgierz
- Gmina: Stryków
- Town rights: 1394

Government
  - Mayor: Witold Kosmowski

Area
  - Total: 8.15 km^{2} (3.15 sq mi)

Population (31 December 2020)
  - Total: 3,428 ▼
  - Density: 421/km^{2} (1,090/sq mi)
- Time zone: UTC+1 (CET)
  - Summer (DST): UTC+2 (CEST)
- Postal code: 95-010
- Vehicle registration: EZG
- Website: http://www.strykow.pl

Stryków [ˈstrɨkuf] is a town in central Poland, in Łódź Voivodeship, in Zgierz County. It has 3,428 inhabitants (2020). It is located within the historic Łęczyca Land.

== History ==
=== Early history ===
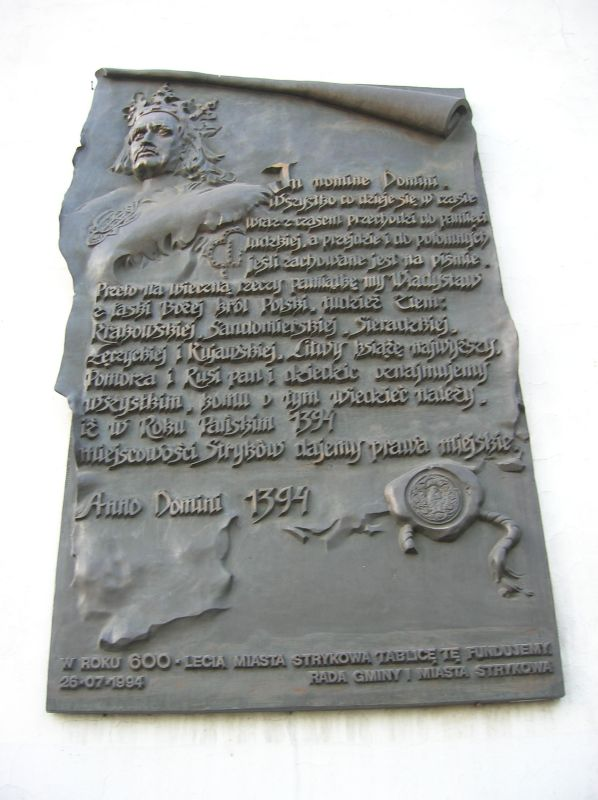
Plaque commemorating the granting of town rights by King Władysław II Jagiełło in 1394

The first mention of Stryków was in 1387. Stryków was a village situated on the route from Zgierz to Łowicz. Stryków received town rights in 1394 from King Władysław II Jagiełło, at the request of the heir of the town founder, Deresław Strykowski. It was a private town, administratively located in the Brzeziny County in the Łęczyca Voivodeship in the Greater Poland Province of the Kingdom of Poland. In the middle of the eighteenth century, the town had 45 artisans (13 clothiers, 5 merchants and shopkeepers, and 5 others) and was a local center of commerce and crafts. It was also a center of aristocratic wealth.

In 1744 the town received the privilege of organizing eight fairs a year. Stryków belonged to medium-sized cities. Textile manufacturing was attempted by the then owner Feliks Czarnecki but without success. The town economy remained centered on crafts and agriculture. Contemporary activities have left traces of the old town in the form of an existing semi-circular square in the town center.

After the Second Partition of Poland, Stryków was annexed by Kingdom of Prussia, and later in the period 1807–15 in the short-lived Polish Duchy of Warsaw and then in the Russian-controlled Polish Kingdom, from 1867 on as part of Piotrków Governorate. In the nineteenth century Stryków lost its town rights. The reason for the stagnation of population growth was the rapid development of nearby Łódź and rapidly growing Pabianice and Zgierz.

=== Modern history ===
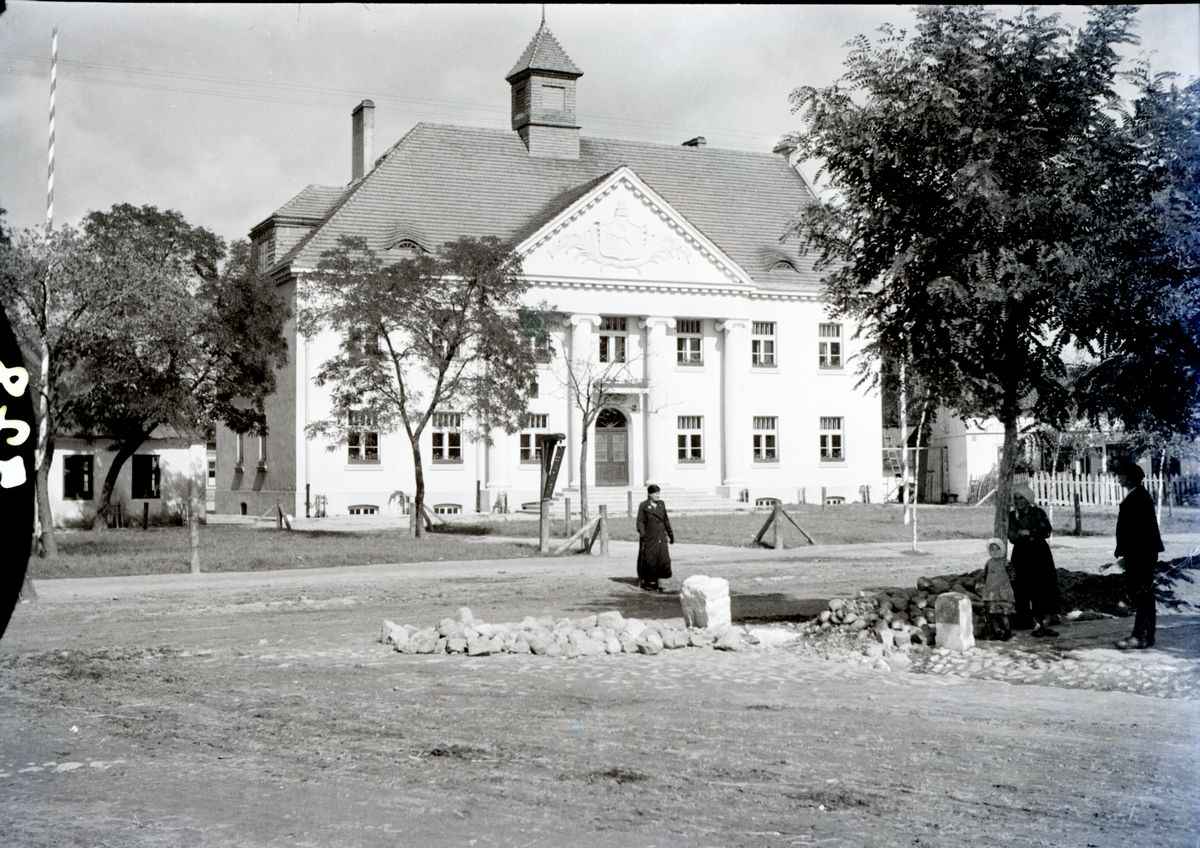
Stryków in the interbellum

In 1902 Stryków was linked by rail to Warsaw and Łódź, which was followed by population growth. This rail link was closed for some years but was reopened in October 2011. Shortly after regaining town rights in 1923, Stryków recovered as a town, with the economy based on shoemaking and tailoring. In Stryków yarn and textiles were produced, and there was a brickyard.

The town had approximately 5,000 inhabitants in 1939 when the German troops invaded and occupied the town. About 2,000, or 40 percent, were Jewish. They were abused constantly by the German policemen and the local ethnic German population. Their possessions were stolen. After being forced into an overcrowded ghetto (up to eight people shared each room) with no sewage system, in 1942 they were rounded up. Some were sent to the Łódz ghetto and most to the Chełmno extermination camp where they were gassed immediately. Only around 20 survived the war.

Poles in the town were used as forced labor during the German occupation. Several Poles, who were either born or lived and worked in Stryków, were murdered by the Russians in the Katyn massacre in 1940. The town was 45% smaller after the war due to the outflow of local Germans who moved west with the retreating German troops, the murder of almost the entire Jewish community, and deaths in the Polish community.

Northwest of the center of Stryków, are the remains of the Jewish cemetery, where the last burial took place in 1946.

In the post-war period, Stryków has become a bedroom community for the Łódź metropolis - many residents working in Łódź or in Zgierz and the new industrial estates. Stryków is located at the intersection of the two major highways in Poland, A1 and A2.

== Notable people ==
- Zishe Breitbart (1893–1925), Polish-Jewish strongman
