= Zelgoszcz, Gmina Stryków =

Zelgoszcz
- Village
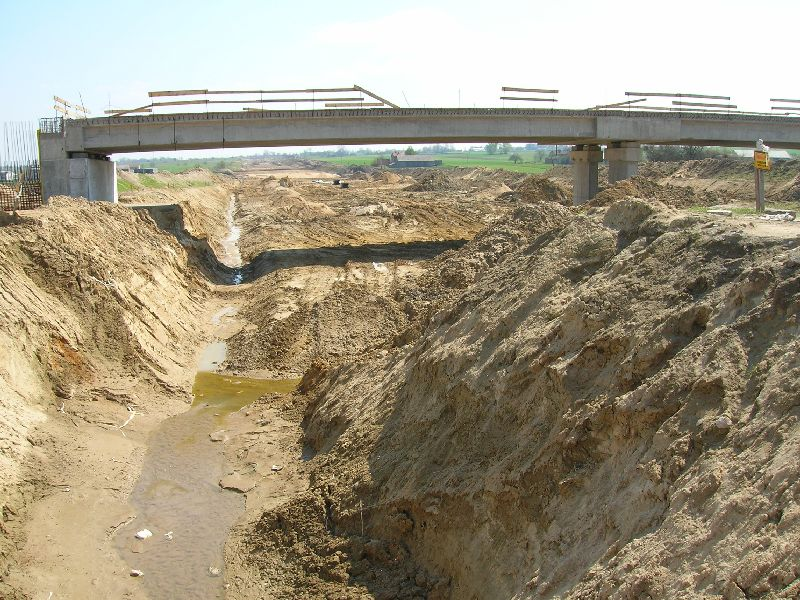

- Location within Poland
- Coordinates: 51°53′13″N 19°31′36″E
- Country: Poland
- Voivodeship: Łódź
- County: Zgierz
- Gmina: Stryków

Zelgoszcz [ˈzɛlɡɔʂt͡ʂ] is a village in the administrative district of Gmina Stryków, within Zgierz County, Łódź Voivodeship, in central Poland.
