= Smolice, Zgierz County =

Smolice
- Village
- Location within Poland
- Coordinates: 51°54′7″N 19°34′32″E
- Country: Poland
- Voivodeship: Łódź
- County: Zgierz
- Gmina: Stryków

Smolice [smɔˈlit͡sɛ] is a village in the administrative district of Gmina Stryków, within Zgierz County, Łódź Voivodeship, in central Poland.
