= Krucice =

- Village
- Location within Poland
- Coordinates: 51°56′00″N 19°35′18″E
- Country: Poland
- Voivodeship: Łódź
- County: Zgierz
- Gmina: Stryków

Krucice [kruˈt͡ɕit͡sɛ] is a village in the administrative district of Gmina Stryków, within Zgierz County, Łódź Voivodeship, in central Poland.
