= Sosnowiec-Pieńki =

- Village
- Location within Poland
- Coordinates: 51°52′45″N 19°35′54″E
- Country: Poland
- Voivodeship: Łódź
- County: Zgierz
- Gmina: Stryków

Sosnowiec-Pieńki (Polish pronunciation: [sɔsˈnɔvjɛts ˈpjɛj̃kʲi]) is a village in the administrative district of Gmina Stryków, within Zgierz County, Łódź Voivodeship, in central Poland.
