= Dobieszków =

- Village
- Location within Poland
- Coordinates: 51°51′07″N 19°34′53″E
- Country: Poland
- Voivodeship: Łódź
- County: Zgierz
- Gmina: Stryków
- Population (approx.): 130

Dobieszków [dɔˈbjɛʂkuf] is a village in the administrative district of Gmina Stryków, within Zgierz County, Łódź Voivodeship, in central Poland.

The village has an approximate population of 130.
