= Niesułków =

- Village
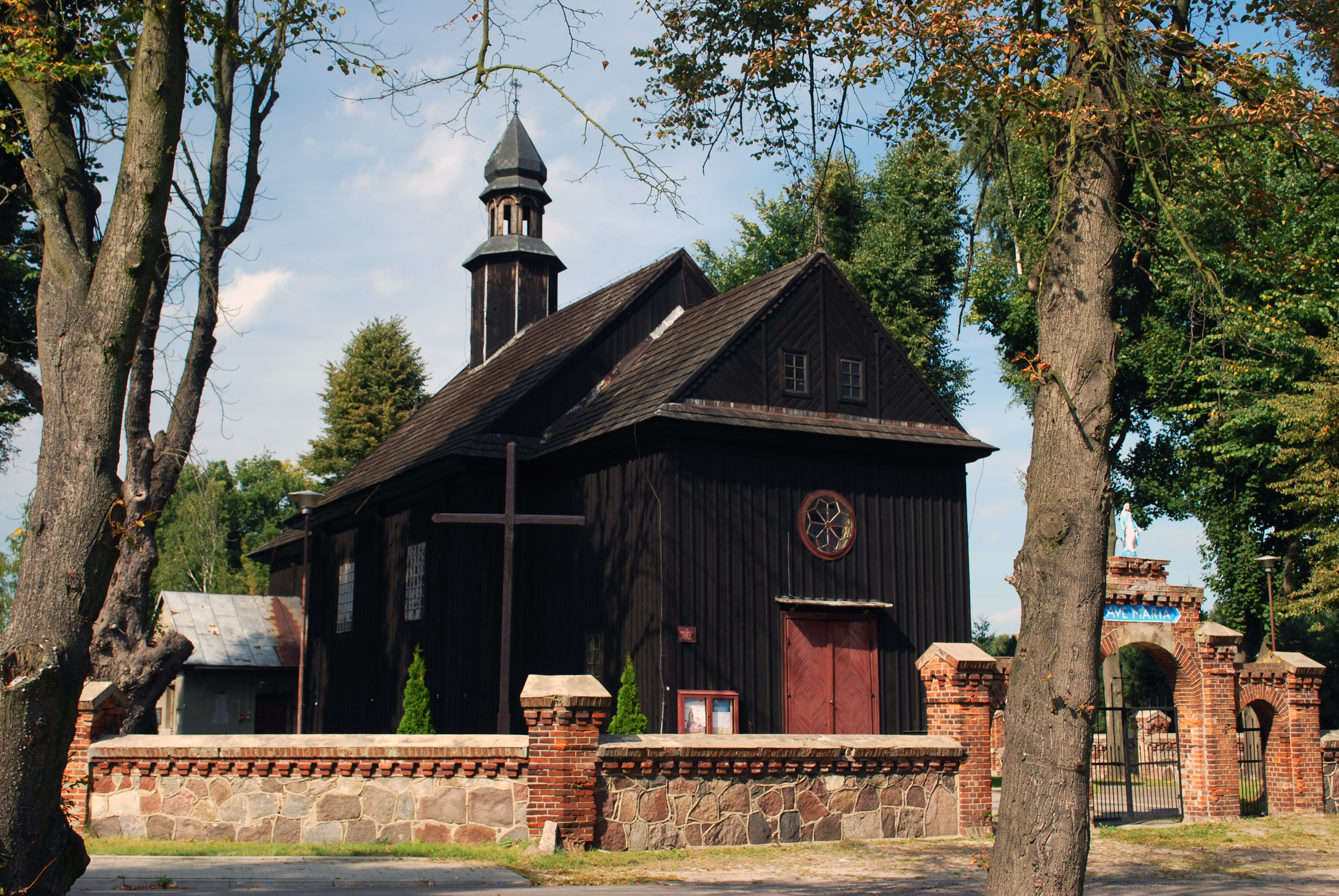
- Church of Saint Adalbert

- Location within Poland
- Coordinates: 51°53′13″N 19°39′32″E
- Country: Poland
- Voivodeship: Łódź
- County: Zgierz
- Gmina: Stryków

Niesułków [ɲɛˈsuu̯kuf] is a village in the administrative district of Gmina Stryków, within Zgierz County, Łódź Voivodeship, in central Poland.
