= Lipa, Łódź Voivodeship =

Lipa
- Village
- Location within Poland
- Coordinates: 51°55′6″N 19°35′54″E
- Country: Poland
- Voivodeship: Łódź
- County: Zgierz
- Gmina: Stryków
- Population: 70

Lipa [ˈlipa] is a village in the administrative district of Gmina Stryków, within Zgierz County, Łódź Voivodeship, in central Poland.
