= Kalinów, Zgierz County =

Kalinów
- Village
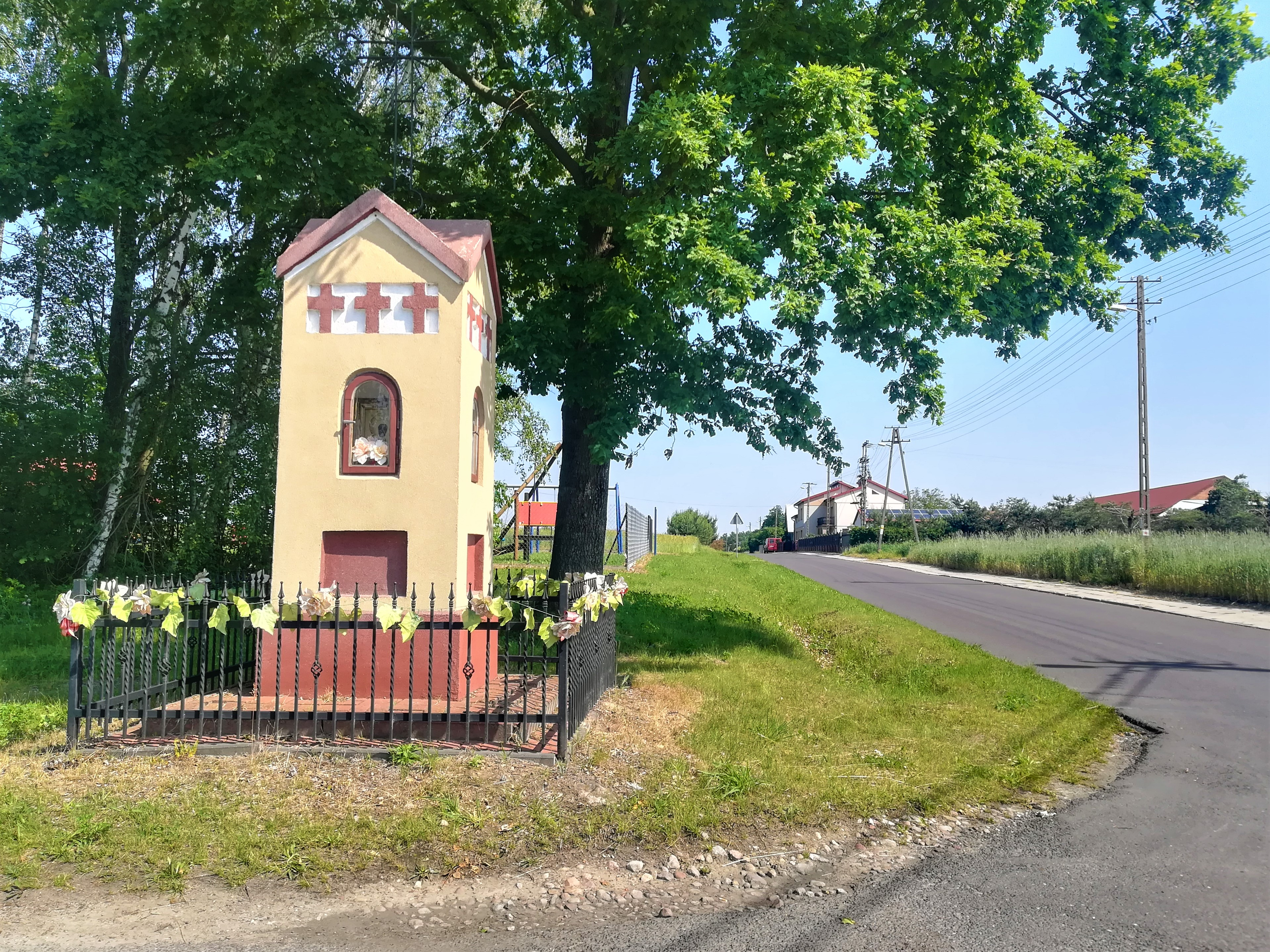

- Location within Poland
- Coordinates: 51°55′N 19°41′E
- Country: Poland
- Voivodeship: Łódź
- County: Zgierz
- Gmina: Stryków
- Elevation: 296 m (971 ft)
- Population: 130

Kalinów [kaˈlinuf] is a village in the administrative district of Gmina Stryków, within Zgierz County, Łódź Voivodeship, in central Poland.
