= Zishe Breitbart =

Polish circus performer

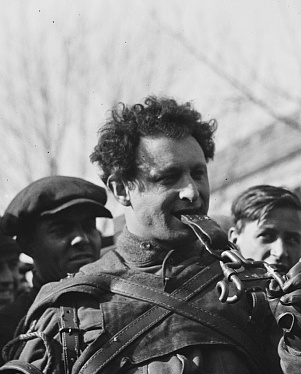
- Breitbart in 1923
- Born: Siegmund Breitbart; 22 February 1893; Stryków, Congress Poland
- Died: 12 October 1925 (aged 32); Berlin, Germany
- Known for: Strongman feats

Siegmund Breitbart (22 February 1893 – 12 October 1925), also known popularly as Zishe or Sische Breitbart (Yiddish: זישע ברייטבאַרט), was a Polish-born circus performer, vaudeville strongman and Jewish folklore hero. He was known as the "Strongest Man in the World" and Eisenkönig ("Ironking") during the 1920s.

== Early life ==
Breitbart was born into an observant Jewish family of blacksmiths in Stryków near Łódź (Poland), on February 22, 1893.

== Strongman ==
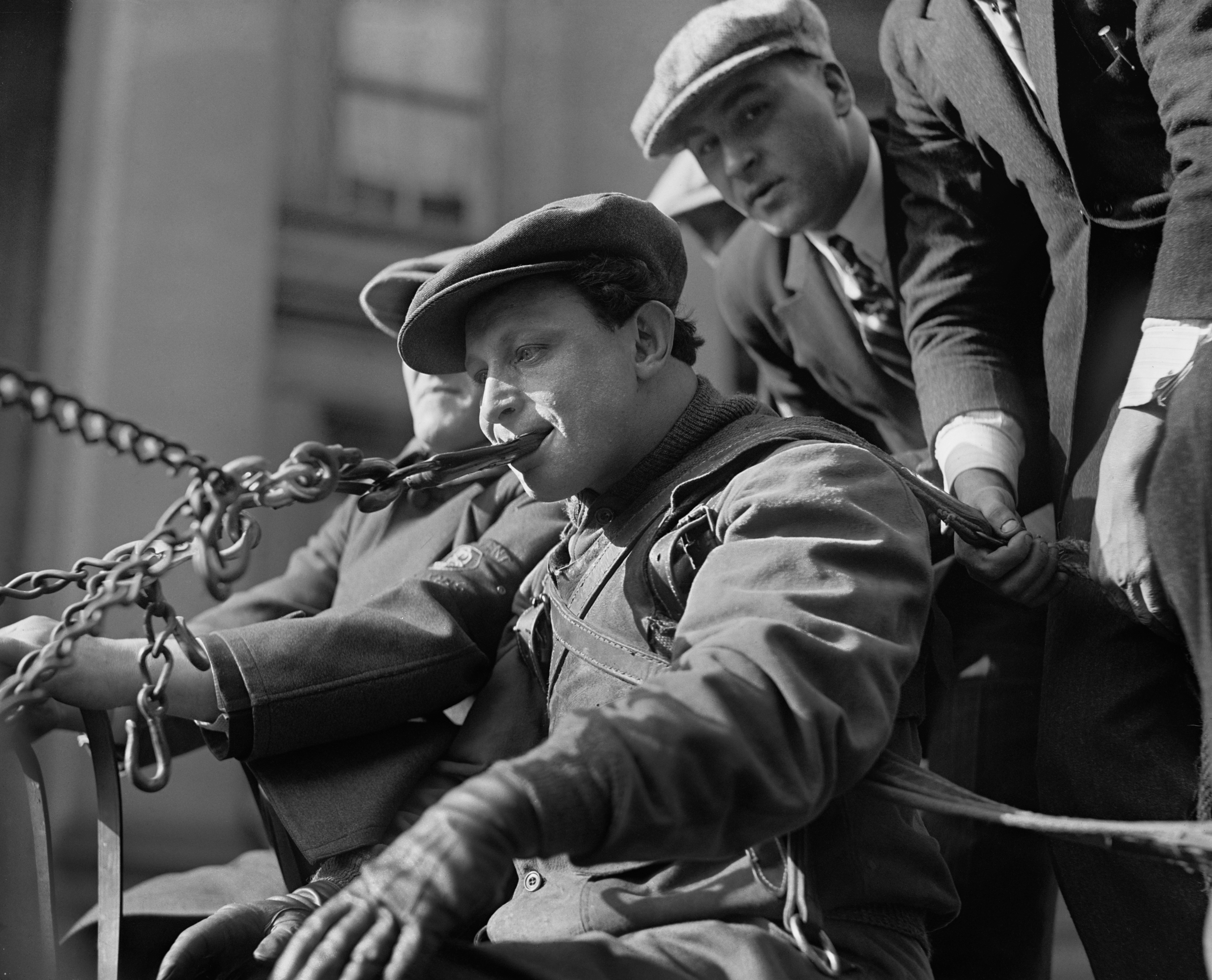
Performing in 1923

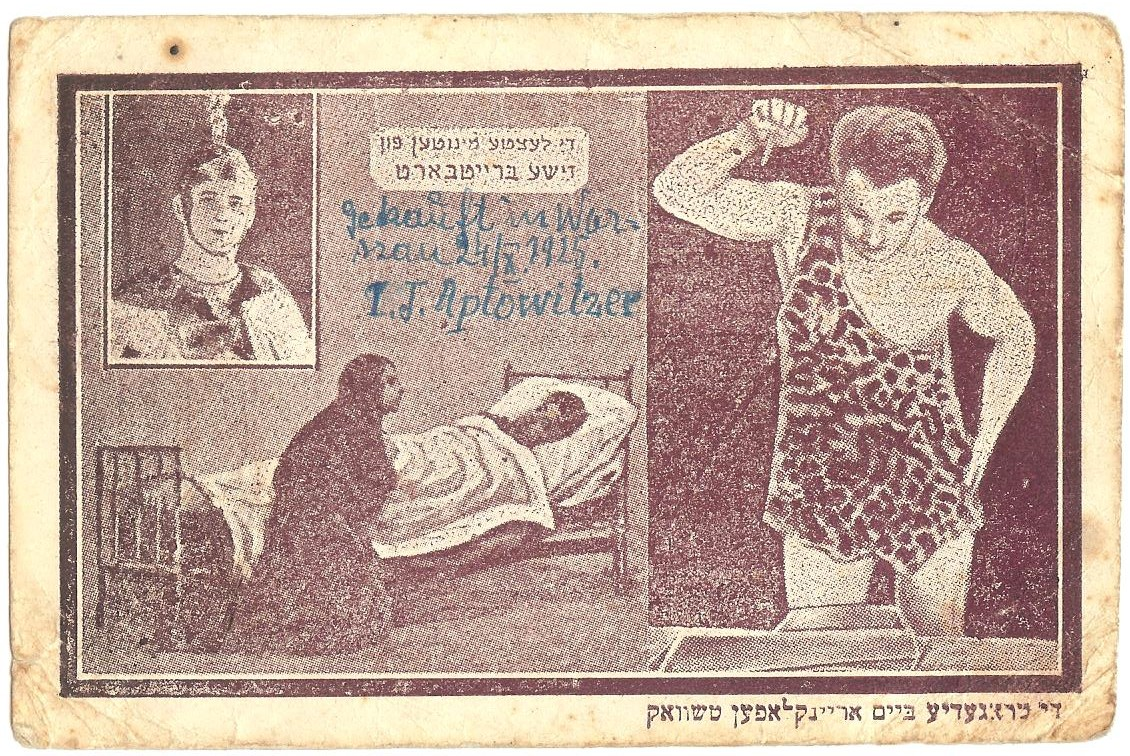
Post card written in Yiddish showing Breitbart in his last performance

Breitbart performed extensively in Europe and America touring with the Circus Busch using a strength act themed to fit his former background as a blacksmith. He bent iron bars around his arm in floral patterns, bit through iron chains or tore them apart, and even broke horseshoes in half. It has been reported that he would tear solid steel sheets 5/8" thick and 3 feet long. As a showman, Breitbart feats also included holding back two whipped horses, pulling a wagon-load of people with his teeth and supporting enormous weights, such as automobiles loaded with up to ten passengers, while lying on his back. Stones would be broken by sledge-hammers on his chest. He also lifted a baby elephant, and while holding on to the elephant, he climbed a ladder and held a locomotive wheel by rope in his teeth while three men were suspended from the wheel.

Breitbart took one of the most popular feats among the strongmen of the era and made it part of his act. During The Tomb of Hercules, a bridge was built across his chest and heavy beasts such as a bull, or an elephant, were paraded over the boards. But Breitbart took it a step further, he would support a motordrome on his chest while two men chased each other on motorcycles inside.

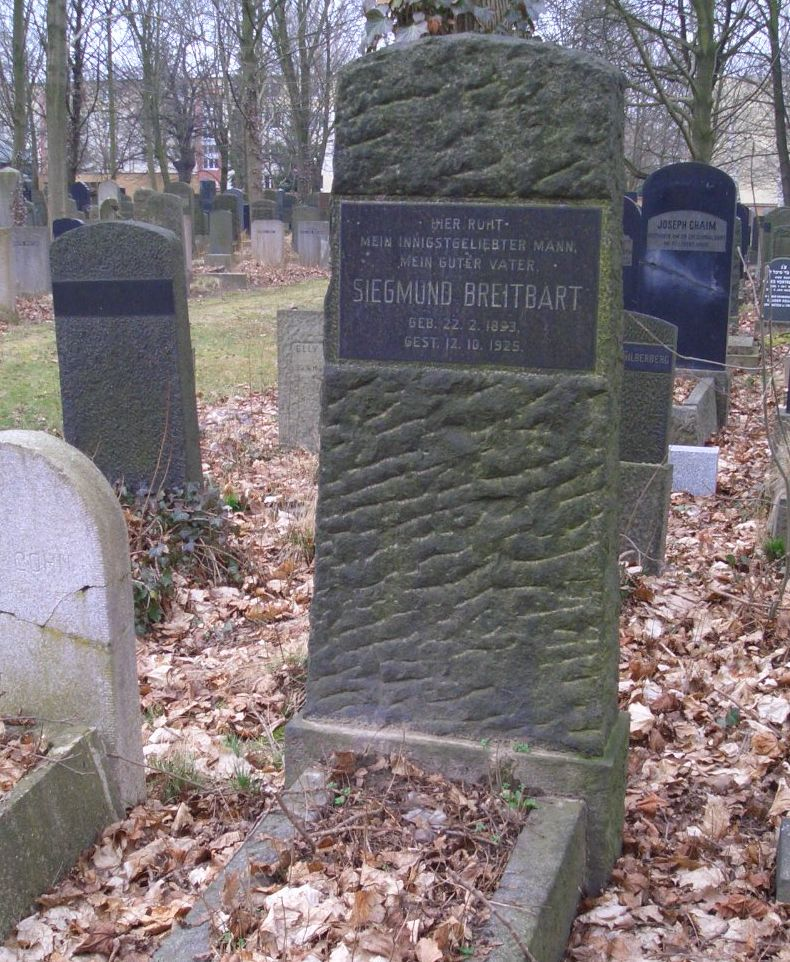
The grave of Siegmund Breitbart at Adass Jisroel graveyard, Berlin.

Seizing on the mail-order muscle-development-course craze of the time, Breitbart authored a book titled Muscular Power and the Breitbart mail-order course. The course was based around body-weight exercises and a special "Breitbart Apparatus", a progressive resistance exerciser made to simulate steel bending movements.

He starred in the 1923 film The Iron King.

== Death ==
Breitbart died eight weeks after he accidentally injured himself during a strongman demonstration in Radom, Poland. He stabbed himself in the knee with a spike he drove through five 1-inch-thick (25 mm) oak boards using only his bare hands. The wound became infected, which led to fatal blood poisoning. Although he endured ten operations in which both legs were amputated, the infection was too severe. Breitbart died in October 1925. He was buried in the Adass-Jisroel cemetery in Berlin.

== Legacy ==
Breitbart was played by Finnish strongman Jouko Ahola in a highly fictionalized account of his life in Werner Herzog's 2001 film Invincible.

He was also the inspiration for the children's book Zishe the Strongman by Robert Rubenstein, from Kar-Ben Publishing.

The Reform Judaism Magazine have credited Breitbart, who was billed during his 1923 American tour as "the Superman of the Ages," with inspiring Joe Shuster and Jerry Siegel to create the iconic superhero Superman, although Jerry Siegel and Joe Shuster never said anything about his influence.

One of his direct descendants is American Pilates instructor and writer Joan Breibart.
