= Sosnowiec, Zgierz County =

Sosnowiec
- Village
- Location within Poland
- Coordinates: 51°53′12″N 19°34′4″E
- Country: Poland
- Voivodeship: Łódź
- County: Zgierz
- Gmina: Stryków

Sosnowiec (pronounced [sɔsˈnɔvjɛts]) is a village in the administrative district of Gmina Stryków, within Zgierz County, Łódź Voivodeship, in central Poland.
