= The Iron King (1923 film) =

1923 film directed by Max Neufeld

- Directed by: Max Neufeld
- Written by: Tilde Fogl
- Starring: Siegmund Breitbart; Eugen Neufeld; Georg Kundert
- Cinematography: Franz Aigner
- Production company: Filmzentrale
- Release date: 16 September 1923
- Country: Austria
- Languages: Silent; German intertitles

The Iron King (German: Der Eisenkönig) is a 1923 Austrian silent film directed by Max Neufeld and starring Siegmund Breitbart, Eugen Neufeld and Georg Kundert.

== Cast ==
- Siegmund Breitbart
- Eugen Neufeld as Sherriff, ein Gladiator
- Georg Kundert as Vater Breitbart, Schmied
- Karl Ehmann as Varieteedirektor
- Hanns Marschall as Pierrot
- Mizzi Griebl as Frau des Zirkusdirektors
- Ossi Breitbart as Prinz
- Manja Keller as Mutter Breitbart

== Bibliography ==
- Elisabeth Büttner & Christian Dewald. Das tägliche Brennen: eine Geschichte des österreichischen Films von den Anfängen bis 1945, Volume 1. Residenz, 2002.
