= Zagloba satana =

Scientific classification
- Kingdom: Animalia
- Phylum: Arthropoda
- Clade: Pancrustacea
- Class: Insecta
- Order: Coleoptera
- Suborder: Polyphaga
- Infraorder: Cucujiformia
- Family: Coccinellidae
- Genus: Zagloba
- Species: Z. satana

Binomial name
- Zagloba satana Gordon, 1985

Species of beetle

Zagloba satana is a species of lady beetle in the family Coccinellidae. It is found in North America, where it has been recorded from Texas.

== Description ==
Adults reach a length of about 1.65 mm. They have a black body, while the lateral border of the pronotum is dark reddish brown and the antennae, mouthparts and legs are yellowish brown.

== Etymology ==
The species name refers to the type locality.
