= Zagloba bicolor =

Scientific classification
- Kingdom: Animalia
- Phylum: Arthropoda
- Clade: Pancrustacea
- Class: Insecta
- Order: Coleoptera
- Suborder: Polyphaga
- Infraorder: Cucujiformia
- Family: Coccinellidae
- Genus: Zagloba
- Species: Z. bicolor

Binomial name
- Zagloba bicolor Casey, 1899

Species of beetle

Zagloba bicolor is a species of beetle of the family Coccinellidae. It is found in North America, where it has been recorded from Florida.

== Description ==
Adults reach a length of about 1.65–1.85 mm. They have a pale yellowish brown body, while the pronotum is yellowish red and the elytron is black or dark brown.
