= Niesułków-Kolonia =

- Village
- Location within Poland
- Coordinates: 51°52′45″N 19°41′29″E
- Country: Poland
- Voivodeship: Łódź
- County: Zgierz
- Gmina: Stryków

Niesułków-Kolonia [ɲɛˈsuu̯kuf kɔˈlɔɲa] is a village in the administrative district of Gmina Stryków, within Zgierz County, Łódź Voivodeship, in central Poland.
