= Rokitnica, Zgierz County =

Rokitnica
- Village
- Location within Poland
- Coordinates: 51°54′32″N 19°38′4″E
- Country: Poland
- Voivodeship: Łódź
- County: Zgierz
- Gmina: Stryków

Rokitnica [rɔkitˈnit͡sa] is a village in the administrative district of Gmina Stryków, within Zgierz County, Łódź Voivodeship, in central Poland.
