= Pludwiny =

- Village
- Location within Poland
- Coordinates: 51°59′N 19°36′E
- Country: Poland
- Voivodeship: Łódź
- County: Zgierz
- Gmina: Stryków

Pludwiny [pludˈvinɨ] is a village in the administrative district of Gmina Stryków, within Zgierz County, Łódź Voivodeship, in central Poland.
