= Wyskoki =

- Village
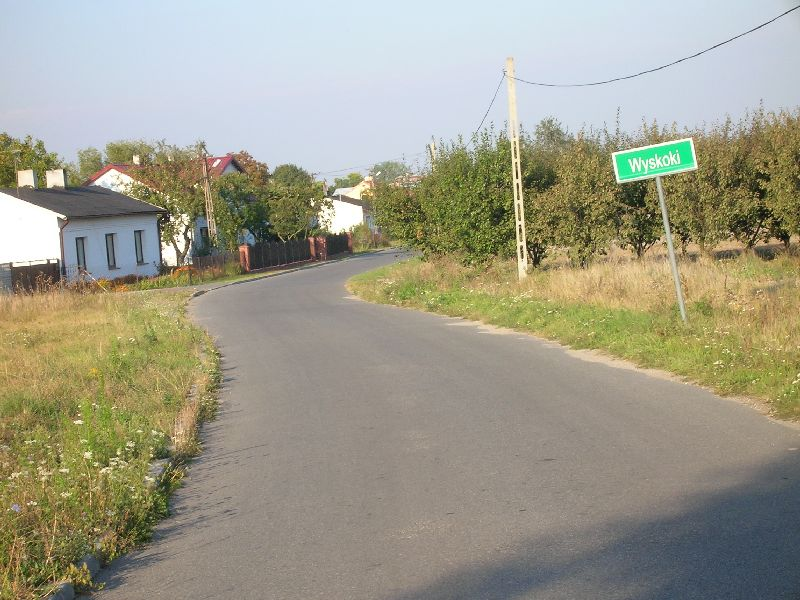

- Location within Poland
- Coordinates: 51°57′N 19°41′E
- Country: Poland
- Voivodeship: Łódź
- County: Zgierz
- Gmina: Stryków

Wyskoki [vɨsˈkɔki] is a village in the administrative district of Gmina Stryków, within Zgierz County, Łódź Voivodeship, in central Poland.
