= Sierżnia =

- Village
- Location within Poland
- Coordinates: 51°51′55″N 19°39′4″E
- Country: Poland
- Voivodeship: Łódź
- County: Zgierz
- Gmina: Stryków

Sierżnia [ˈɕɛrʐɲa] is a village in the administrative district of Gmina Stryków, within Zgierz County, Łódź Voivodeship, in central Poland.
