= Cesarka =

- Village
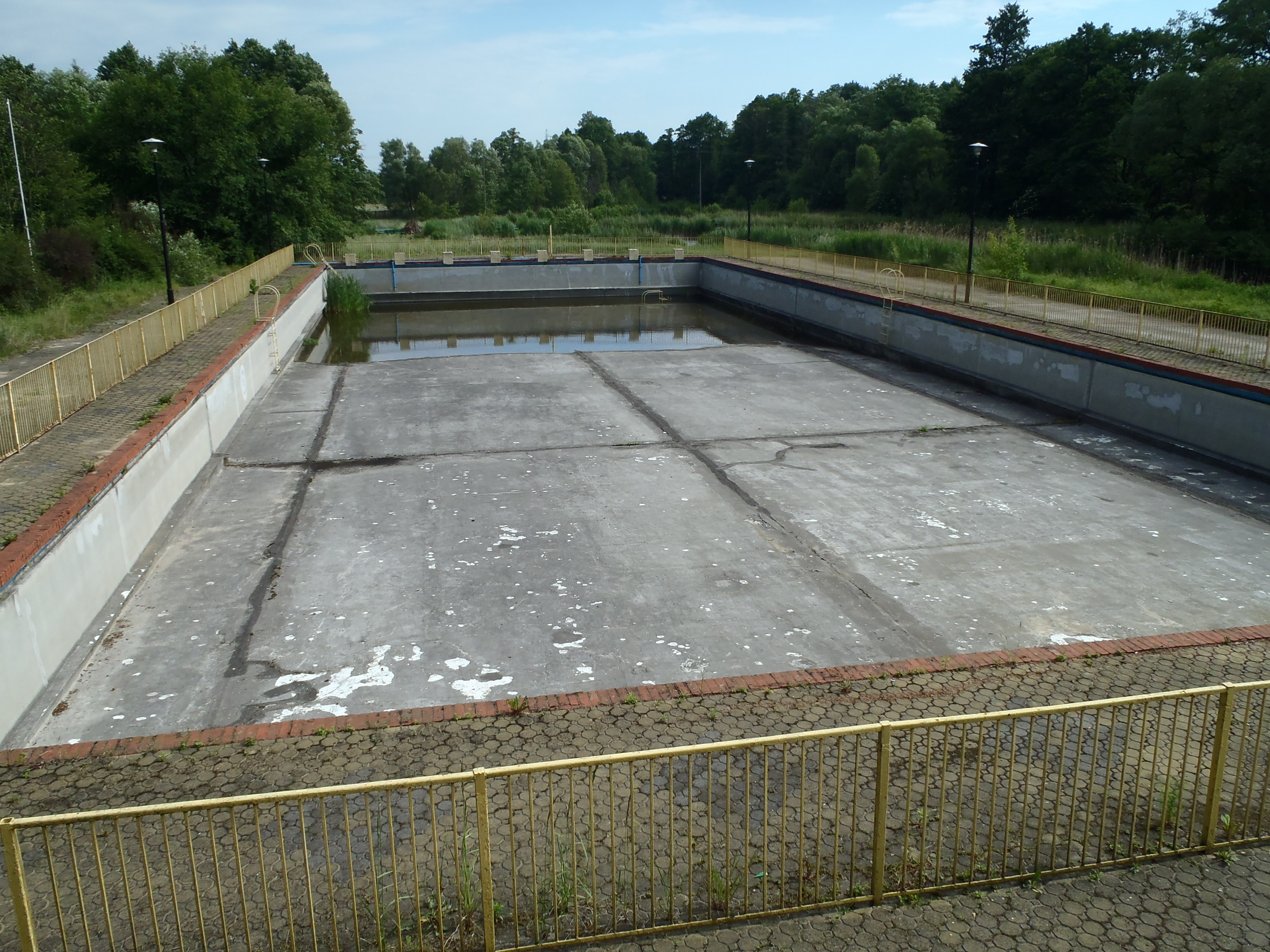

- Location within Poland
- Coordinates: 51°52′52″N 19°36′55″E
- Country: Poland
- Voivodeship: Łódź
- County: Zgierz
- Gmina: Stryków
- Population: 40

Cesarka [t͡sɛˈsarka] is a village in the administrative district of Gmina Stryków, within Zgierz County, Łódź Voivodeship, in central Poland.
