= Orzechówek, Zgierz County =

Orzechówek
- Village
- Location within Poland
- Coordinates: 51°52′24″N 19°34′16″E
- Country: Poland
- Voivodeship: Łódź
- County: Zgierz
- Gmina: Stryków
- Population: 30

Orzechówek [ɔʐɛˈxuvɛk] is a village in the administrative district of Gmina Stryków, within Zgierz County, Łódź Voivodeship, in central Poland.
