= Dobra-Nowiny =

- Village
- Location within Poland
- Coordinates: 51°50′35″N 19°32′0″E
- Country: Poland
- Voivodeship: Łódź
- County: Zgierz
- Gmina: Stryków

Dobra-Nowiny [ˈdɔbra nɔˈvinɨ] is a village in the administrative district of Gmina Stryków, within Zgierz County, Łódź Voivodeship, in central Poland.
