= Zagloba hystrix =

Scientific classification
- Kingdom: Animalia
- Phylum: Arthropoda
- Clade: Pancrustacea
- Class: Insecta
- Order: Coleoptera
- Suborder: Polyphaga
- Infraorder: Cucujiformia
- Family: Coccinellidae
- Genus: Zagloba
- Species: Z. hystrix

Binomial name
- Zagloba hystrix Casey, 1899

Species of beetle

Zagloba hystrix is a species of lady beetle in the family Coccinellidae. It is found in North America, where it has been recorded from Texas.

== Description ==
Adults reach a length of about 1.45-1.75 mm. They have a reddish brown body, while the antennae, legs and mouthparts are yellowish brown and the elytron is dark brown to black.
