= Ciołek, Łódź Voivodeship =

Ciołek
- Village
- Location within Poland
- Coordinates: 51°56′14″N 19°32′36″E
- Country: Poland
- Voivodeship: Łódź
- County: Zgierz
- Gmina: Stryków

Ciołek [ˈt͡ɕɔwɛk] is a village in the administrative district of Gmina Stryków, within Zgierz County, Łódź Voivodeship, in central Poland.
