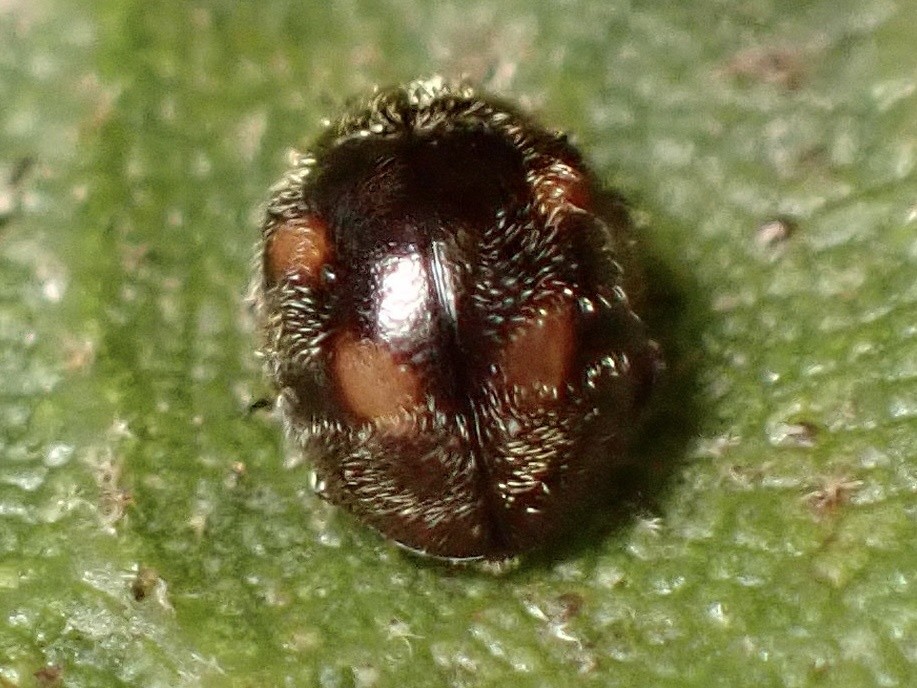
- Zagloba ornata

Scientific classification
- Kingdom: Animalia
- Phylum: Arthropoda
- Clade: Pancrustacea
- Class: Insecta
- Order: Coleoptera
- Suborder: Polyphaga
- Infraorder: Cucujiformia
- Family: Coccinellidae
- Tribe: Coccidulini
- Genus: Zagloba; Casey, 1899

= Zagloba (beetle) =

Genus of beetles

Zagloba is a genus of scalehunter lady beetles in the family Coccinellidae. There are at least four described species in the Zagloba genus.

== Species ==
- Zagloba aeneipennis (Sicard, 1929)
- Zagloba beaumonti Casey, 1899
- Zagloba bicolor Casey, 1899
- Zagloba hystrix Casey, 1899
- Zagloba mimica González & Aguilera, 2009
- Zagloba obscura Gordon, 1970
- Zagloba ornata (Horn, 1895)
- Zagloba satana Gordon, 1985
