= Zagłoba, Łódź Voivodeship =

Zagłoba
- Village
- Location within Poland
- Coordinates: 51°57′33″N 19°31′44″E
- Country: Poland
- Voivodeship: Łódź
- County: Zgierz
- Gmina: Stryków
- Population: 110

Zagłoba [zaˈɡwɔba] is a village in the administrative district of Gmina Stryków, within Zgierz County, Łódź Voivodeship, in central Poland.
