= Tymianka, Łódź Voivodeship =

Tymianka
- Village
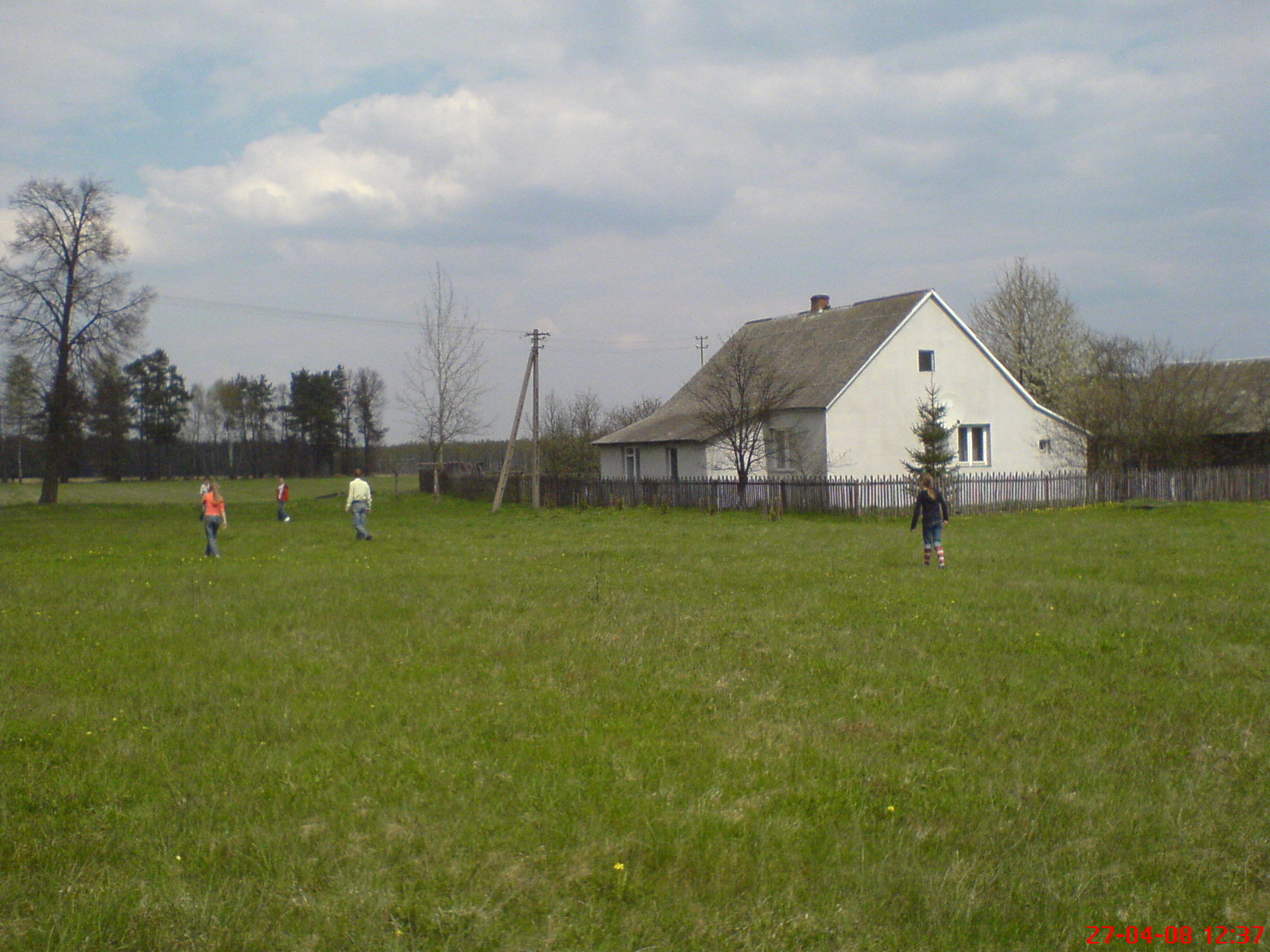

- Location within Poland
- Coordinates: 51°55′13″N 19°34′42″E
- Country: Poland
- Voivodeship: Łódź
- County: Zgierz
- Gmina: Stryków
- Population: 200
- Website: www.strykow.pl

Tymianka [tɨˈmjaŋka] is a village in the administrative district of Gmina Stryków, within Zgierz County, Łódź Voivodeship, in central Poland.
