= Zagloba aeneipennis =

Scientific classification
- Kingdom: Animalia
- Phylum: Arthropoda
- Clade: Pancrustacea
- Class: Insecta
- Order: Coleoptera
- Suborder: Polyphaga
- Infraorder: Cucujiformia
- Family: Coccinellidae
- Genus: Zagloba
- Species: Z. aeneipennis

Binomial name
- Zagloba aeneipennis (Sicard, 1929)

Synonyms
- Scymnus (Nephus) aeneipennis Sicard, 1929

Species of beetle

Zagloba aeneipennis is a species of beetle of the family Coccinellidae. It is found in Martinique and Trinidad.

== Biology ==
They prey on Aspidiotus destructor and Parlagena bennetti.
