= Gozdów, Łódź Voivodeship =

Gozdów
- Village
- Location within Poland
- Coordinates: 51°58′6″N 19°34′0″E
- Country: Poland
- Voivodeship: Łódź
- County: Zgierz
- Gmina: Stryków

Gozdów [ˈɡɔzduf] is a village in the administrative district of Gmina Stryków, within Zgierz County, Łódź Voivodeship, in central Poland.
