= Sadówka =

- Village
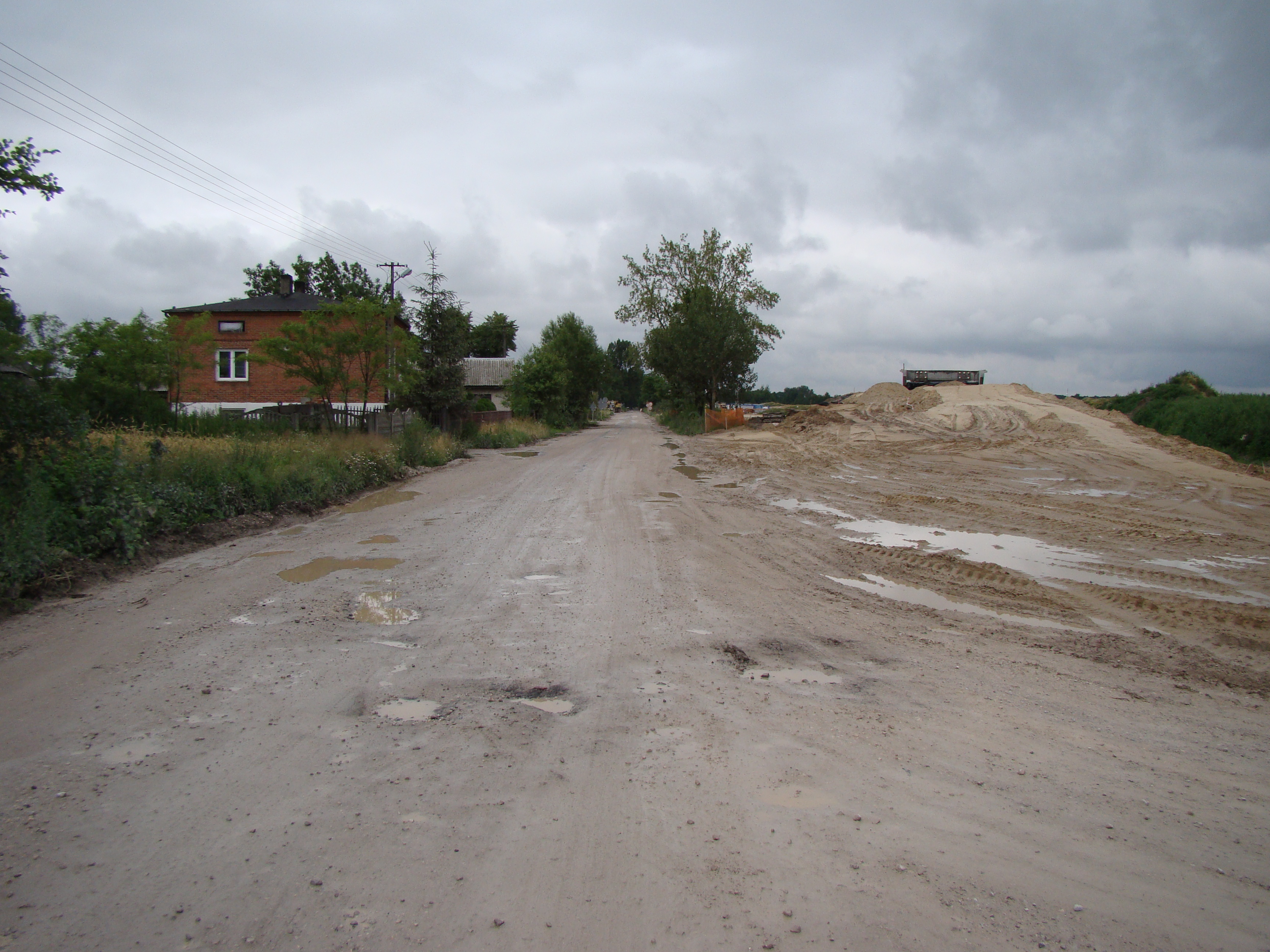

- Location within Poland
- Coordinates: 51°58′N 19°35′E
- Country: Poland
- Voivodeship: Łódź
- County: Zgierz
- Gmina: Stryków
- Time zone: UTC+1 (CET)
  - Summer (DST): UTC+2 (CEST)
- Vehicle registration: EZG

Sadówka [saˈdufka] is a village in the administrative district of Gmina Stryków, within Zgierz County, Łódź Voivodeship, in central Poland.

== History ==
Sadówka was a private village of Polish nobility, administratively located in the Brzeziny County in the Łęczyca Voivodeship in the Greater Poland Province of the Kingdom of Poland.

On September 12, 1939, during the German invasion of Poland which started World War II, invading German troops carried out a massacre of a dozen or so local Polish inhabitants (see Nazi crimes against the Polish nation).

== Transport ==
The Polish A1 motorway runs nearby, east of the village.
