= Wola Błędowa =

- Village
- Location within Poland
- Coordinates: 51°56′N 19°38′E
- Country: Poland
- Voivodeship: Łódź
- County: Zgierz
- Gmina: Stryków

Wola Błędowa [ˈvɔla bwɛnˈdɔva] is a village in the administrative district of Gmina Stryków, within Zgierz County, Łódź Voivodeship, in central Poland.
