= Zgierz =

City in Poland

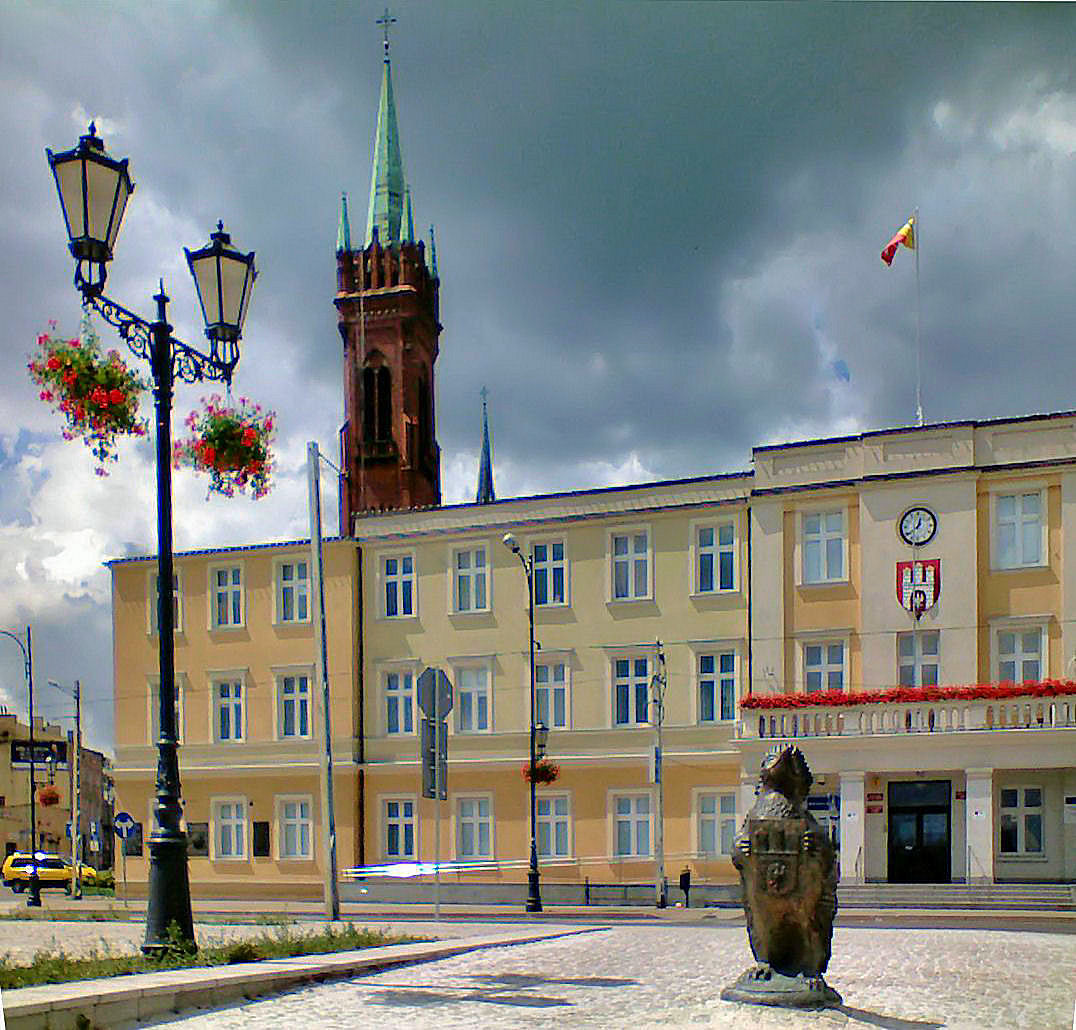
- Town hall (Ratusz); Steeple of Saint Catherine church seen in the background

- Flag Coat of arms

- Location within Poland
- Coordinates: 51°51′N 19°25′E
- Country: Poland
- Voivodeship: Łódź
- County: Zgierz
- Gmina: Zgierz (urban gmina)
- First mentioned: 1231
- City rights: before 1244

Government
  - City President: Przemysław Staniszewski

Area
  - Total: 42.33 km^{2} (16.34 sq mi)
- Elevation: 40 m (130 ft)

Population (31 December 2021)
  - Total: 54,974 ▼
  - Density: 1,299/km^{2} (3,364/sq mi)
- Time zone: UTC+1 (CET)
  - Summer (DST): UTC+2 (CEST)
- Postal code: 95-100 to 95-110
- Area code: (+48) 42
- Car plates: EZG
- Website: http://www.umz.zgierz.pl

Zgierz [zɡʲɛʂ] is a city in central Poland, located just to the north of Łódź, and part of the Łódź metropolitan area. As of 2021, it had a population of 54,974. Located within the historic Łęczyca Land, it is the capital of Zgierz County in the Łódź Voivodeship.

== History ==
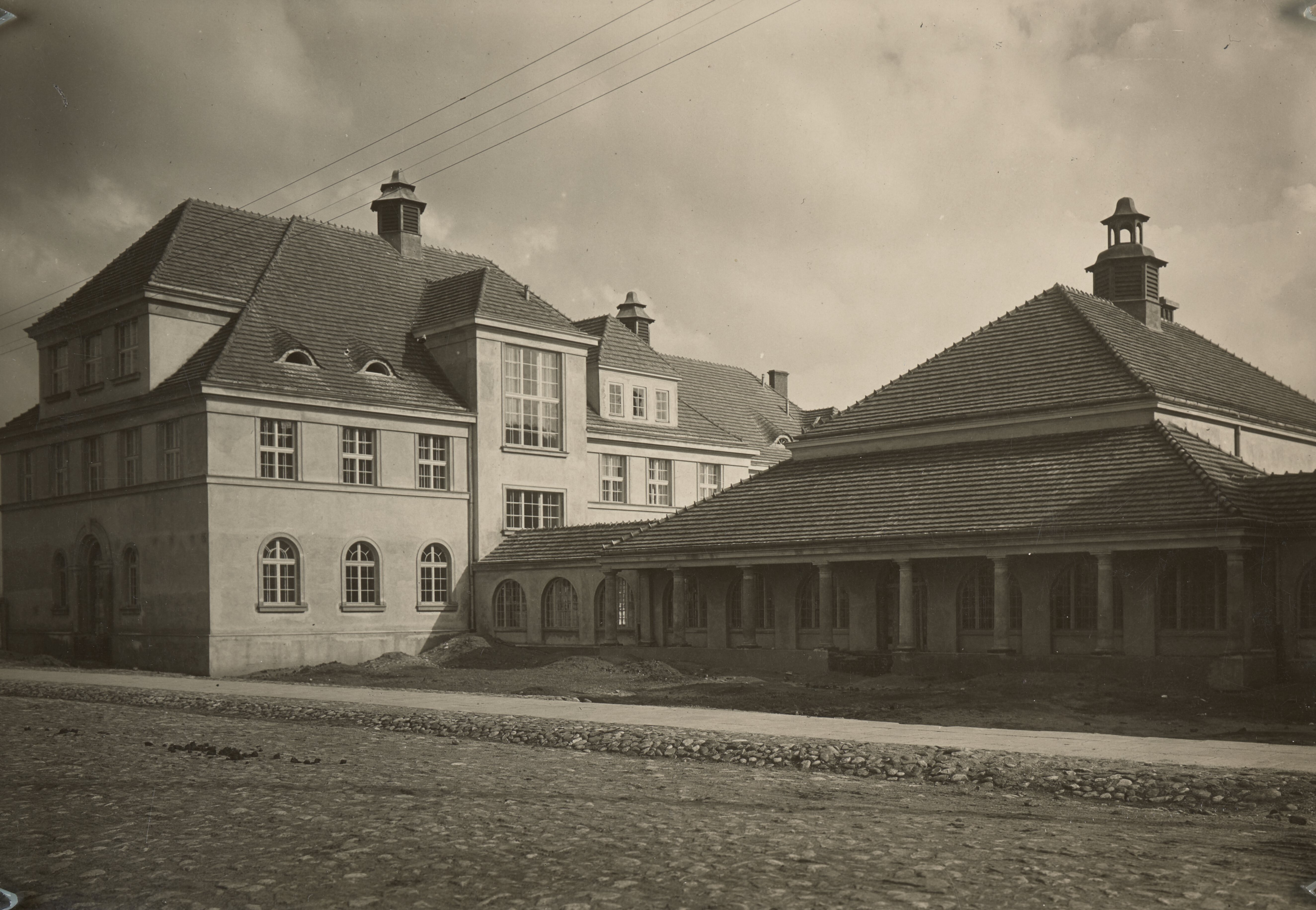
Zgierz in the interwar period

Zgierz is one of the oldest cities in central Poland. The oldest known mention of Zgierz comes from 1231, when two dukes of fragmented Piast-ruled Poland, Władysław Odonic of Greater Poland and Konrad I of Masovia, held a meeting there. Zgierz acquired its city rights some time before 1288, and those rights were renewed by Polish King Władysław II Jagiełło in 1420. In 1494, King John I Albert exempted the city from taxes for 10 years, and in 1504, King Alexander Jagiellon established three annual fairs. Zgierz was a royal city of Poland, administratively located in the Łęczyca County in the Łęczyca Voivodeship in the Greater Poland Province of the Kingdom of Poland.

During the joint German-Soviet invasion of Poland, which started World War II, on 3 and 5 September 1939, Zgierz was raided by Germany, and captured on 6 September. Already in September 1939, the Germans committed first atrocities against Poles and carried out executions of Polish civilian defenders. Inhabitants of Zgierz were also among Poles murdered in nearby Łagiewniki on 12 September and in Retki on 16 September. As part the Intelligenzaktion, Germans carried out large massacres of Poles from the region in the nearby forests of Łagiewniki and Lućmierz, killing hundreds and thousands of people respectively. Germans also carried out expulsions of Poles and deported over 8,000 people to forced labour to Germany. Some were also killed in Nazi concentration camps, including the interwar director of the local State School of Economics, Jakub Stefan Cezak, and local Protestant parish priest, Aleksander Falzman. Schools were closed, factories were looted, Polish monuments were destroyed. Despite this, the Polish underground resistance movement was active in Zgierz.

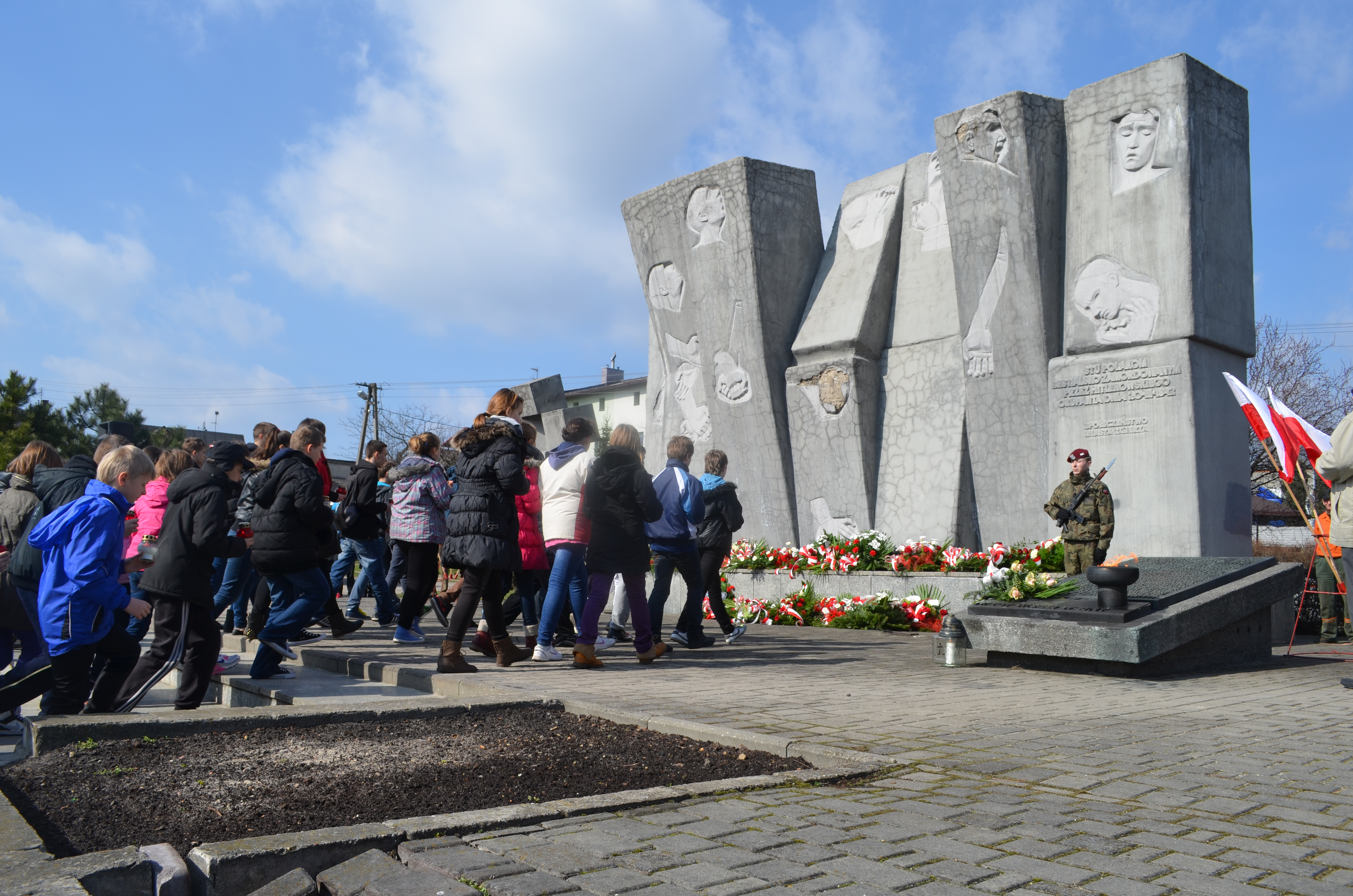
Commemoration of the 72nd anniversary of the German massacre of 100 Poles in Zgierz

Before the war, Zgierz had a thriving Jewish community of around 4,000, which formed 16,6% of the town's populace as of 1931. When the Germans occupied the city, they began persecuting the Jews, with the assistance of local ethnic Germans. The synagogue was burned and Jews were kidnapped from the streets for forced labor. Many tried to flee the town, though some of these returned. In December 1939, the Germans deported 2500 of the Jews to Głowno in the General Gouvernment, German-occupied central Poland. Left behind were fewer than 100 Jews, mostly craftsmen thought to be useful to the Germans. In 1942, these Jews were deported to the Łódź Ghetto. This history is unusual in that no mass killings in Zgierz were reported. Of course, the Jews deported to Łódz and Głowno were caught up in the fate of those communities, and most were later deported to the Treblinka extermination camp. As many as 350 Jewish residents of Zgierz survived the war, but did not return to the town.

On 20 March 1942, the Germans carried out a public execution of 100 Poles in the town, who were then buried in Lućmierz-Las. A memorial was erected at the site of the massacre after the war. Around 50 Poles from Zgierz took part in the Warsaw Uprising in 1944. In total over 7,600 inhabitants of Zgierz died under German occupation, which ended in January 1945.

City limits were expanded in 1954, 1959 and 1988.

== Transport ==
=== Road Transport ===
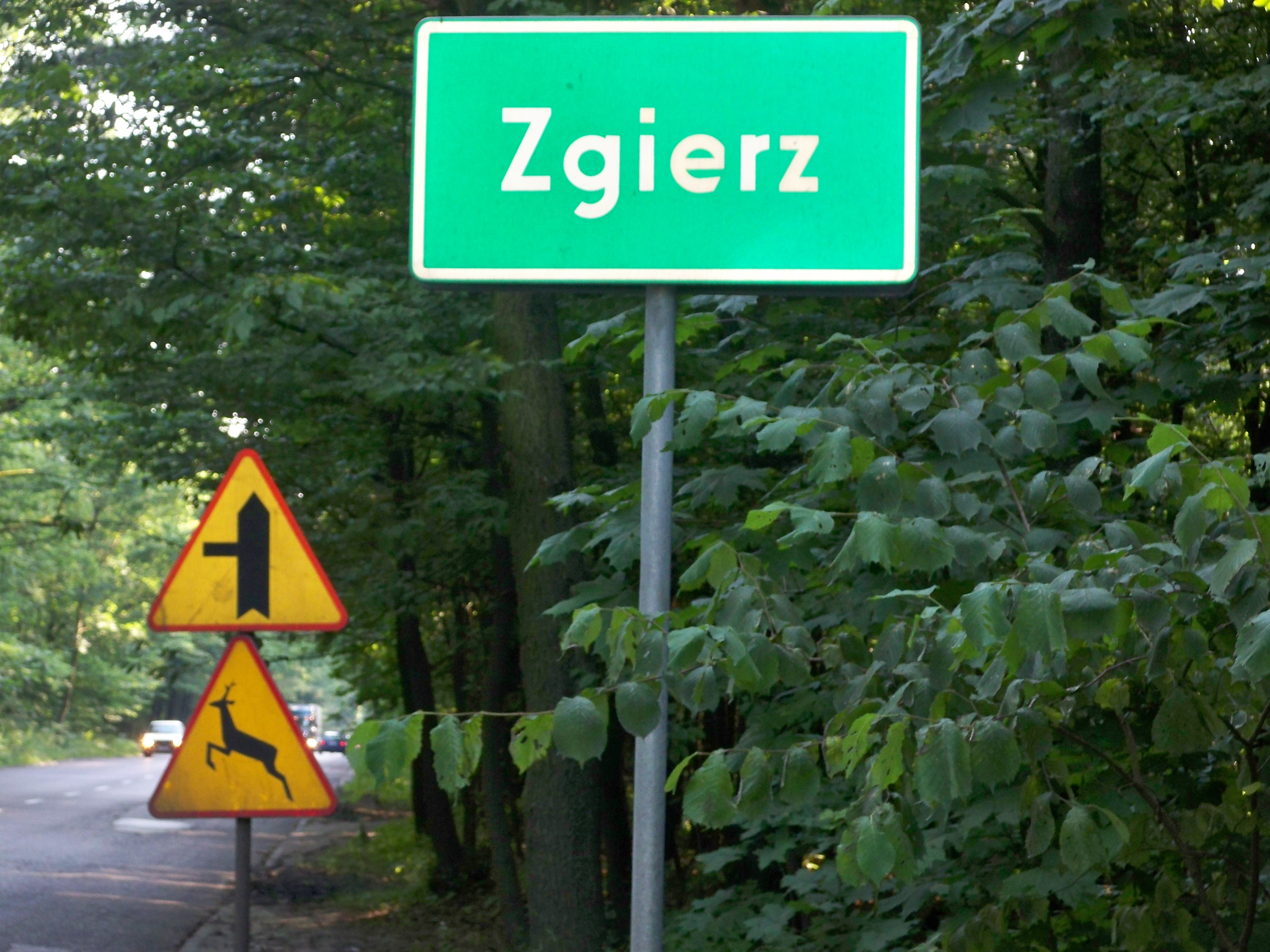
A town entrance sign

Zgierz is intersected by two national roads :

- National Road No. 91 : Gdańsk-Zgierz-Częstochowa
- National Road No. 71 : Stryków-Zgierz-Rzgów

and also by one voivodeship road

- Voivodeship Road No. 702 : Zgierz-Kutno

To the north of the town runs the A2 motorway, which provides connectivity to Zgierz via following junctions :

- Emilia : via National Road No. 91 (approx. 8 km from Zgierz)
- Zgierz Północ (Zgierz North): via Voivodeship Road No. 702 (approx. 6.5 km from Zgierz)
- Stryków : via National Road No. 71 (approx. 14 km from Zgierz)

To the west of the town, the S14 expressway has been constructed, connecting to Zgierz via the Zgierz Zachód (Zgierz West) junction (Aleksandrowska St., National Road No. 71). Thanks to this road, Zgierz is a part of Poland's first high-speed road ring.

=== Rail Transport ===
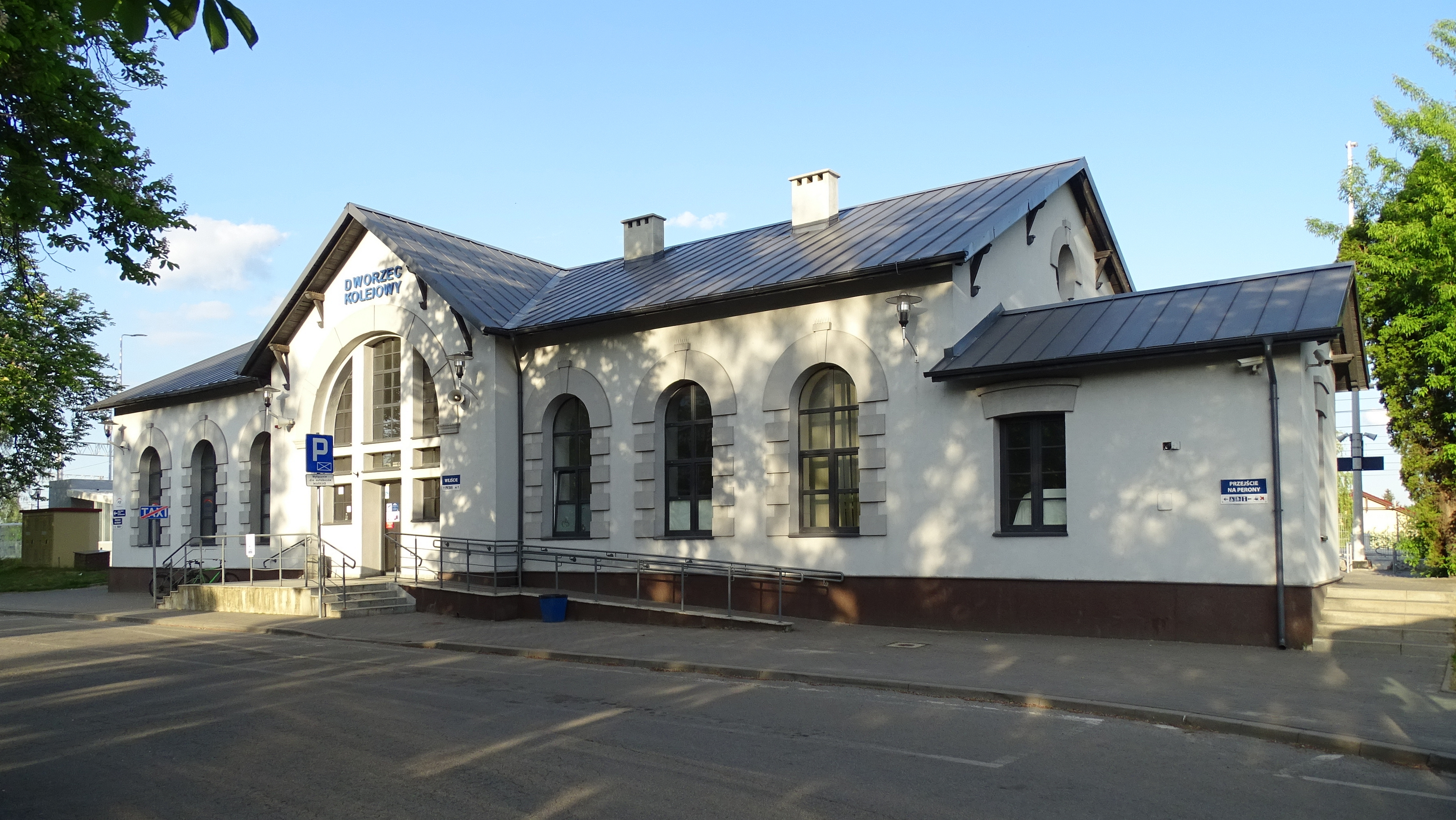
Railway station in Zgierz

The town has one railway station - Zgierz and four railway stops - Zgierz Północ (North), Zgierz Jaracza, Zgierz Kontrewers, Zgierz Rudunki

=== Public Transport ===
==== Tram Service ====
Currently, there is one tram line in operation, line no. 45 operated by MPK Łódź, which runs from Łódź to Kiliński Square (Plac Kilińskiego). There are also plans to reactivate the former tram line to the town of Ozorków. The project envisions a new format, with the route extending only as far as the city borders of Zgierz.

==== Bus Service ====
The public bus operator in Zgierz is the Zgierskie Przedsiębiorstwo Komunikacyjne Markab Sp. z o.o.. The bus depot is located on Wiosny Ludów St.. Currently, 9 bus routes are in service:

- Local town routes
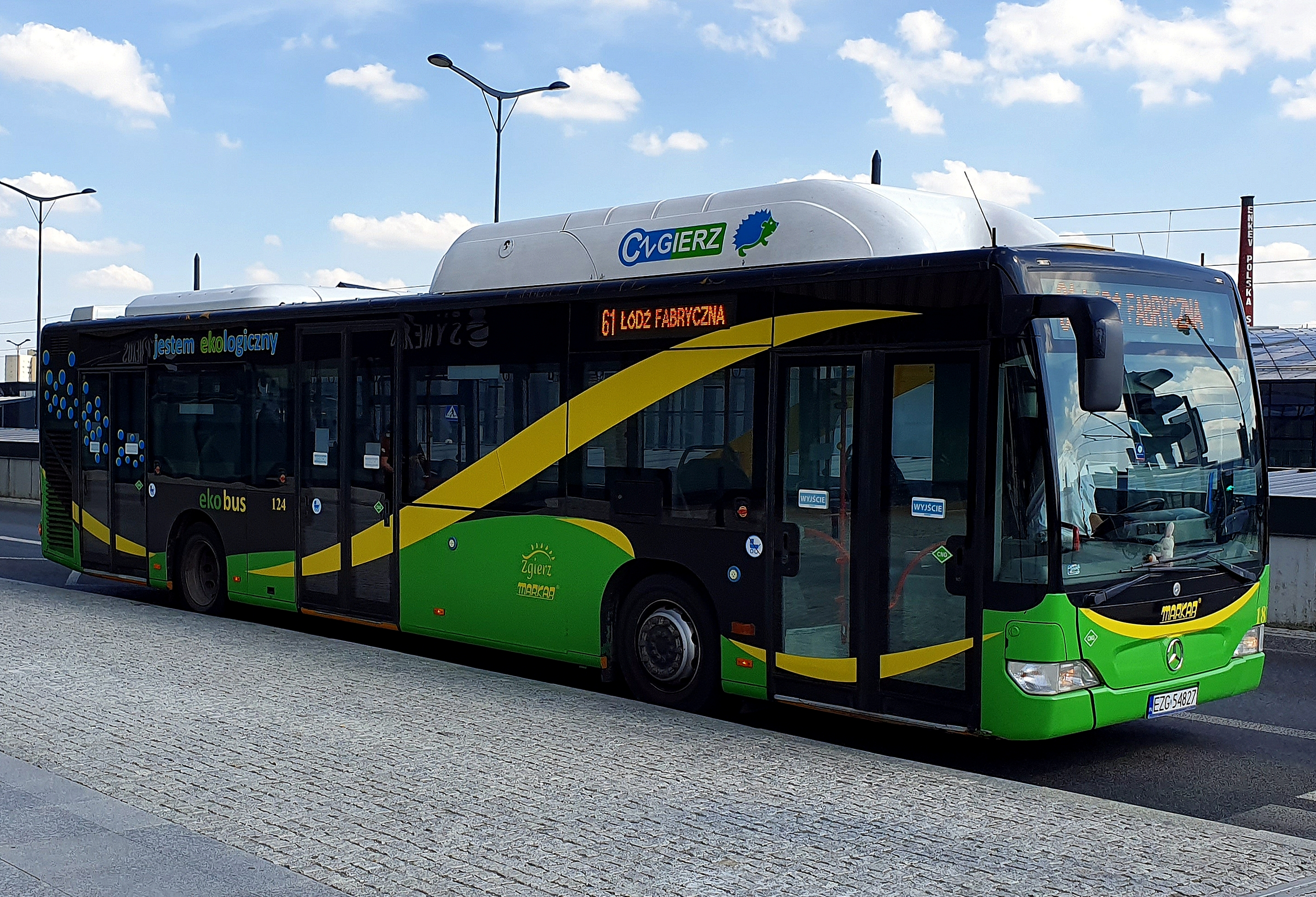
  Mercedes-Benz O530 (city bus) on Łódź Fabryczna Railway Station
  - 1 .
  - 3
  - 4
  - 5
  - 8
  - 9
- Regional routes
  - 10 (Ozorków)
  - 6 and 61 (Łódź)

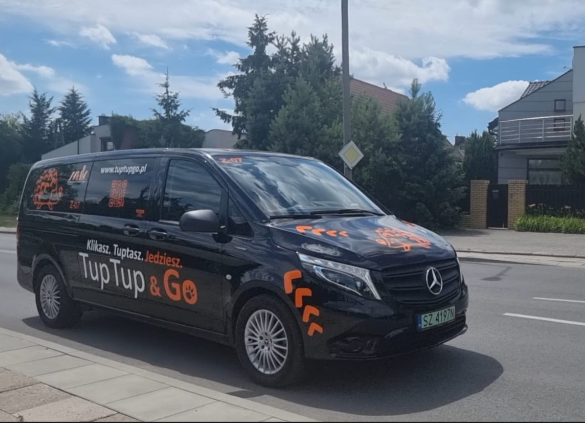
Tup Tup & Go

==== Transport On Demand ====
In 2026, seven vehicles (with a target of ten) were purchased for the "Tup Tup & Go" on-demand transport service, which functions as a hybrid between a taxi and a bus. This project has been discussed numerous times in the context of improving public transport in the Wiosny Ludów, Rudunki and Proboszczewice areas.

"Tup Tup & Go" launched in June 2026. The service was free for the first week, and starting in September, it will be free of charge for holders of the Zgierz "migawka" (city transit pass).

The primary goals of the project are to provide transport to areas not served by standard bus routes or where bus service is infrequent, as well as to assist the elderly who may have difficulty walking to a bus stop, and to offer children and teenagers a safe alternative tor commuting to school.

Passengers request a ride to a specific locations, traveling in shared vehicles that hold up to 8 people, while an intelligent app plans the most efficient route and drop-off order for the passengers.

== Sports ==
One of the first sports organisations in Zgierz was the regional branch of the Polish Gymnastic Society "Sokół" (Polskie Towarzystwo Gimnastyczne "Sokół").

In Zgierz, at Sosnowa 1 St. is located the "Stacja Nowa Gdynia" sports center, which features a swimming pool complex, indoor tenis and squash courts, a bowling alley, a gym, a restaurant, and a hotel and conference center.

Additionally, the city has other sports facilities :

- Malinka Complex - a bathing area, a golf driving range, a multi-purpose sports court complex, a pumptrack, playgrounds (including a water playground) a reservoir with water equipment rentals
- Swimming pools - located at Primary School No. 7 (formerly the Adam Mickiewicz Gymnasium No. 3) on Leśmiana St., and Municipal Bathhouse at Łęczycka 24 St.
- Two football stadiums :
  - The Municipal Sports and Recreation Center (MOSiR)
  - The "Włókniarz" Zgierz Sports Club (ZKS Włókniarz Zgierz) at Musierowicza St.

== Twin towns – sister cities ==
Zgierz is twinned with:

- Bischwiller, France
- Glauchau, Germany
- Hódmezővásárhely, Hungary
- Jihlava, Czech Republic
- Kežmarok, Slovakia
- Kupiškis, Lithuania
- Manevychi Raion, Ukraine
- Orzysz, Poland
- Supraśl, Poland

== Tourism ==
- Church of. St. Catherine of Alexandria (Kościół św. Katarzyny Aleksandryjskiej)
- "Pod Lwami" House (currently the Town Museum)
- urban layout of the "New Town"
- early 20th-century tram loop, located at Jan Kiliński Square (formerly Nowy Rynek)
- Stary Młyn (eng. Old Mill) - home to the Municipal Culture Center MOK
- Tadeusz Kościuszko Park
- railway station Zgierz
- classicist houses
- "Miasto Tkaczy" (Weavers' Town) Cultural Park
- "Malinka" bathing area
- Tourist trails passing through the municipality :
  - Agrotourism Bicycle Trail of Zgierz Municipality
  - Agrotourism Bicycle Trail of Zgierz Municipality - Łagiewniki - Zgierz "Malinka"
  - Trail of Remembrance for the Victims of Nazi Genocide
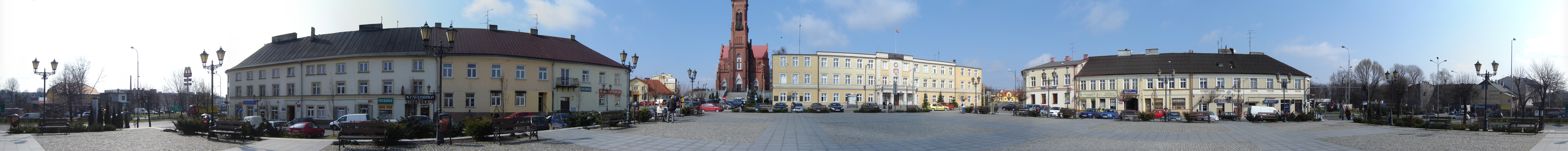
Panorama of the Jan Paweł II square in Zgierz.
