= Warszewice, Łódź Voivodeship =

Warszewice
- Village
- Location within Poland
- Coordinates: 51°52′N 19°37′E
- Country: Poland
- Voivodeship: Łódź
- County: Zgierz
- Gmina: Stryków
- Population: 170

Warszewice [varʂɛˈvit͡sɛ] is a village in the administrative district of Gmina Stryków, within Zgierz County, Łódź Voivodeship, in central Poland.
