= Erazm Ciołek =

Erazm Ciołek may refer to:

- Erazm Ciołek (monk and medieval scholar, known also as Witelo), born c.a. 1230-c.a1300
- Erazm Ciołek (bishop of Płock), b. c.a. 1474
- Erazm Ciołek (photographer) (1937–2012)
