= Anielin Swędowski =

- Village
- Location within Poland
- Coordinates: 51°55′5″N 19°32′29″E
- Country: Poland
- Voivodeship: Łódź
- County: Zgierz
- Gmina: Stryków

Anielin Swędowski (Polish pronunciation: [aˈɲɛlin sfɛnˈdɔfskʲi]) is a village in the administrative district of Gmina Stryków, within Zgierz County, Łódź Voivodeship, in central Poland.
