= Anielin, Zgierz County =

Anielin
- Village
- Location within Poland
- Coordinates: 51°52′3″N 19°39′46″E
- Country: Poland
- Voivodeship: Łódź
- County: Zgierz
- Gmina: Stryków

Anielin [aˈɲɛlin] is a village in the administrative district of Gmina Stryków, within Zgierz County, Łódź Voivodeship, in central Poland.
