= Koźle, Łódź Voivodeship =

Koźle
- Village
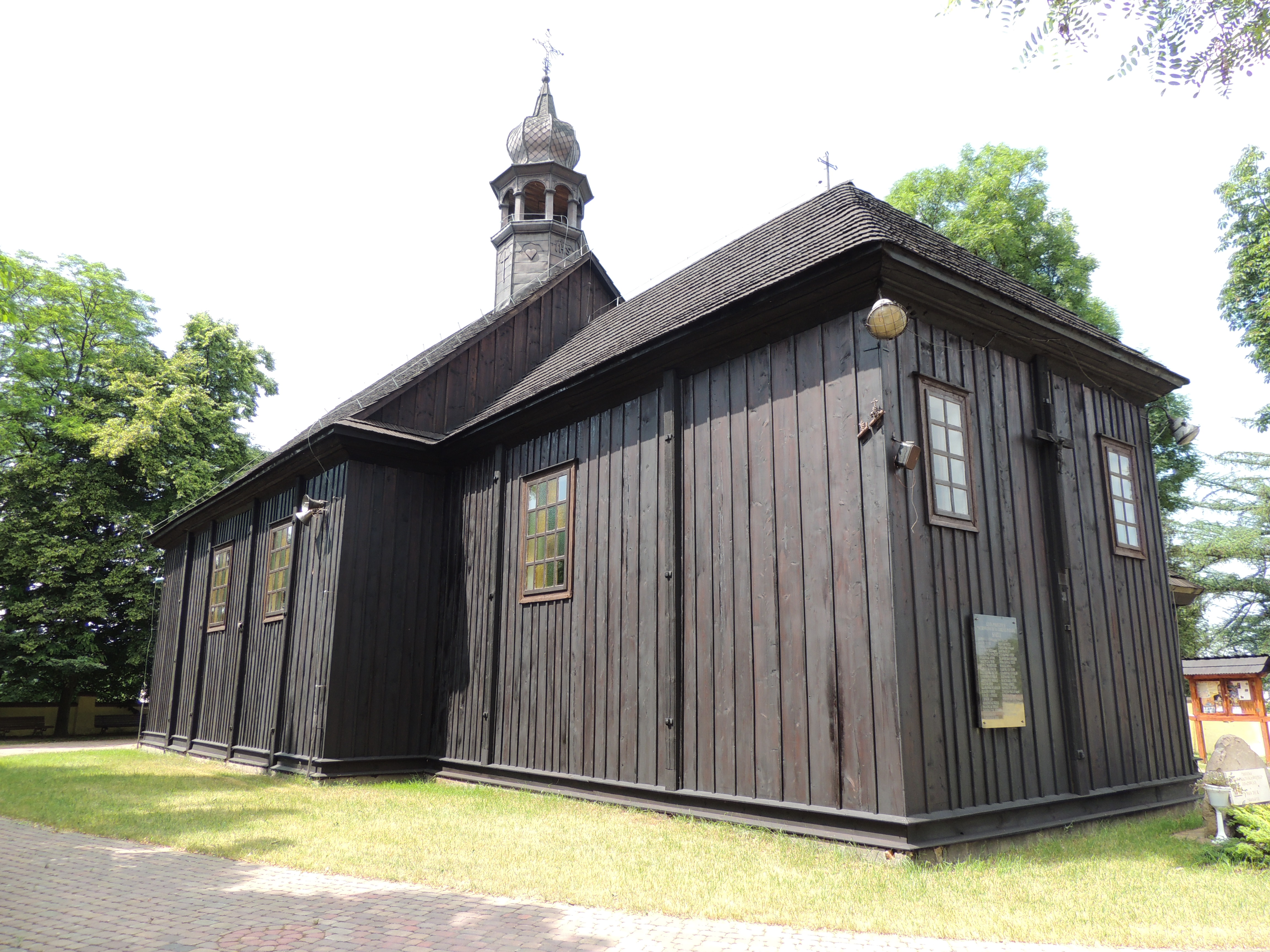
- Saint Stephen church in Koźle

- Location within Poland
- Coordinates: 51°56′26″N 19°35′4″E
- Country: Poland
- Voivodeship: Łódź
- County: Zgierz
- Gmina: Stryków
- Time zone: UTC+1 (CET)
  - Summer (DST): UTC+2 (CEST)
- Vehicle registration: EZG

Koźle [ˈkɔʑlɛ] is a village in the administrative district of Gmina Stryków, within Zgierz County, Łódź Voivodeship, in central Poland.

== History ==
Koźle was a private village of Polish nobility, administratively located in the Brzeziny County in the Łęczyca Voivodeship in the Greater Poland Province of the Kingdom of Poland.

On 8 September 1939, during the German invasion of Poland which started World War II, invading German troops carried out a massacre of 17 local Polish farmers (see Nazi crimes against the Polish nation).

== Transport ==
The Polish A1 motorway runs nearby, east of the village.
