= Łódź Ring Road =

Route information
- Length: 87 km (54 mi) 109 km (68 mi)

Major junctions
- Emilia: A2 and S14, NW of Łódź Łódź Północ: A1 and A2, NE of Łódź; Łódź Południe: A1 and S8, SE of Łódź Róża: S8 and S14, SW of Łódź

Location
- Country: Poland
- Regions: Łódź Voivodeship
- Major cities: Łódź

Highway system
- National roads in Poland; Voivodeship roads

Łódź Ring Road (Obwodnica Łodzi in Polish) is a complex of motorways (A1 and A2) and expressways (S8 and S14) in Poland, built in order to decrease the traffic in the city of Łódź and neighboring regions of Zgierz, Pabianice and Rzgów.

== Sections ==
=== Eastern section: A1 ===
This section is 37 km (23 mi) long and it is a part of E75 European route. It has been opened on July 1, 2016.

==== Junctions ====
Name	Location	Roads
Łódź Północ	Stryków	A 2 ( E30)
Brzeziny	Łódź (Nowosolna)	DK 72
Łódź Wschód	Łódź (Widzew)	DW 713
Łódź Górna	Wola Rakowa	DW 714
Łódź Południe	Tuszyn	S 8 ( E67)

=== Northern section: A2 ===
This section is 20 km (12 mi) long and it is a part of E30 European route. The section between Emilia and Stryków junctions has been opened on July 26, 2006. Following section between Stryków and Łódź Północ junctions has been opened on December 22, 2008.

==== Junctions ====
Name	Location	Roads
Emilia	Emilia	DK 91 / S 14
Zgierz	Stefanów	DW 702
Stryków _{formerly Stryków I}	Stryków	DK 14
Łódź Północ _{formerly Stryków II}	Stryków	A 1 ( E75)

=== Southern section: S8 ===
This section is 19.3 km (12.0 mi) long and it is a part of E67 European route and DK12 Polish national road. The first section between Róża and Rzgów has been opened on April 11, 2014. The second section between Rzgów and Łódź Południe junction has been opened on July 1, 2016.

==== Junctions ====
Name	Location	Roads
Róża	Róża	S 14
Pabianice Południe	Pawlikowice	DW 485
Rzgów	Rzgów	DK 12 / DK 91
Łódź Południe	Tuszyn	A 1 ( E75)

=== Western section: S14 ===
This section is 42 km (26 mi) long. The first section between Dobroń and Łódź Lublinek junctions was opened on May 16, 2012 (400 m (1,300 ft) long section between planned Łódź Lublinek junction and Szynkielew III temporary junction, along with a section of DK14 national road between Pabianicka St. in Łódź and Łódź Lublinek junction) and July 13, 2012 (following Dobroń - Szynkielew III section). The second section, between Róża and Dobroń junctions, has been opened on April 11, 2014. The construction of third section, between Emilia and Łódź Lublinek junctions, has begun in 2019 and opened in July 2023, thus making Łódź the first city in Poland with a complete beltway.

==== Junctions ====
Name	Location	Roads
Emilia	Emilia	DK 91 / A 2 ( E30)
Zgierz Lućmierz	Lućmierz	DK 91
Aleksandrów Łódzki	Aleksandrów Łódzki	DK 71
Łódź Teofilów	Łódź (Teofilów)	DK 72
Konstantynów Łódzki	Konstantynów Łódzki	DK 71
Łódź Retkinia	Łódź (Nowy Józefów)	local road
Łódź Lublinek	Łódź (Lublinek)	DK 14
Pabianice Północ	Szynkielew	DK 71
Dobroń	Chechło Drugie	DW 482
Róża	Róża	DK 12 / S 8 ( E67)
