= Ciosenka =

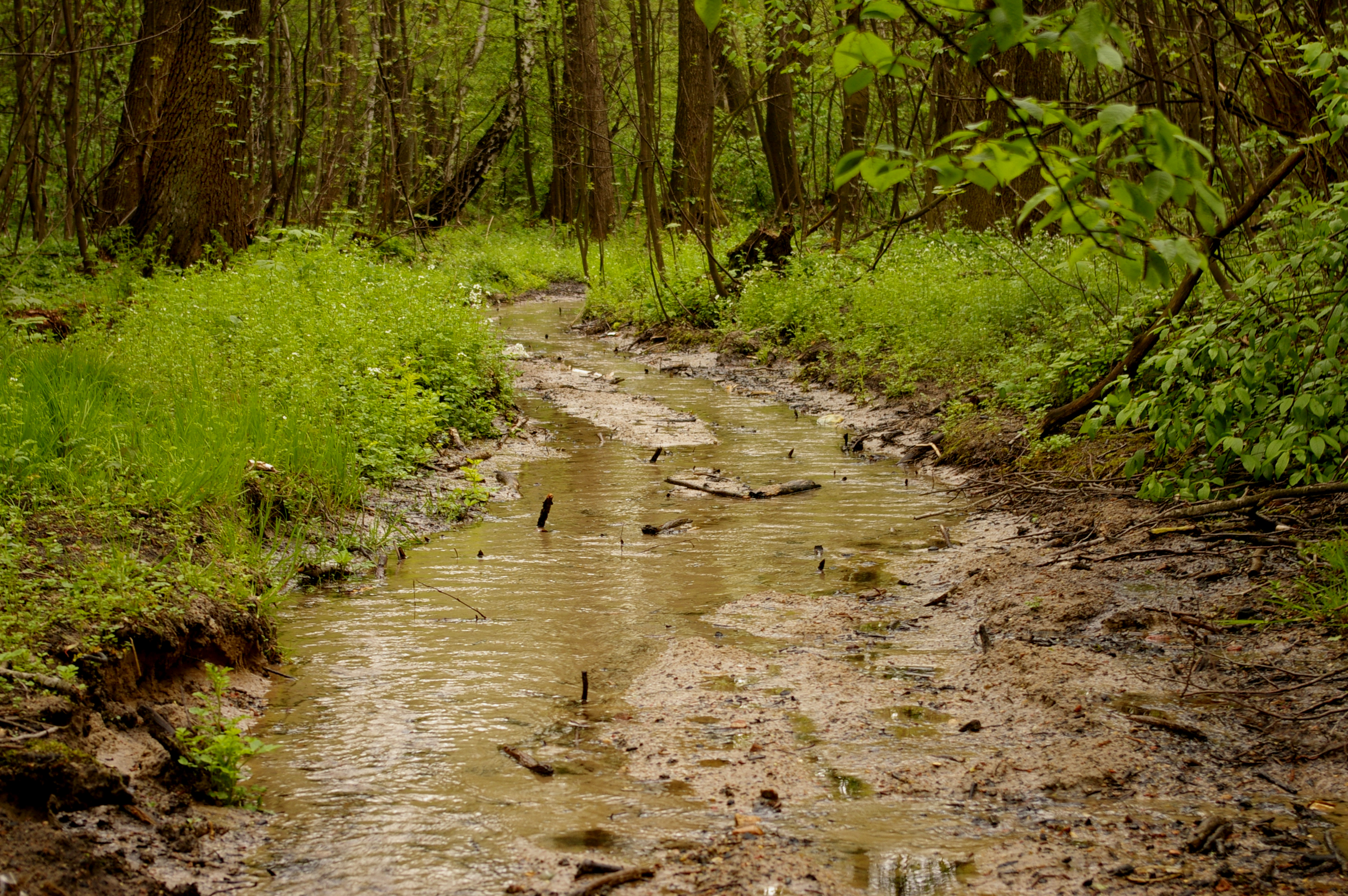
- Ciosenka at Rosanów

Location
- Country: Poland

Physical characteristics
- Source
  - coordinates: 51°54′54″N 19°23′16″E
- Mouth
  - location: Dzierżązna
  - coordinates: 53.4577°N 19.6065°E

Basin features
- Progression: Dzierżązna→ Czerniawka→ Moszczenica→ Bzura→ Vistula→ Baltic Sea

Ciosenka is a small river of Poland, a tributary of the Dzierżązna near the village Dzierżązna.
