= Expressway S14 (Poland) =

Road in Poland

Coordinates: 51°40′45″N 19°18′46″E

Expressway S14
- Droga ekspresowa S14
- Zachodnia Obwodnica Łodzi

Route information
- Length: 41.1 km (25.5 mi) 43.6 km (27.1 mi) planned

Major junctions
- North end: A 2 northwest of Łódź
- DK 71 north of Pabianice
- South end: S 8 southwest of Łódź

Location
- Country: Poland
- Regions: Łódź Voivodeship
- Major cities: Łódź

Highway system
- National roads in Poland; Voivodeship roads
← S 12	→ S 16

Expressway S14 or express road S14 (Polish: droga ekspresowa S14) is a short expressway in Poland which serves as the western bypass of Łódź. The total length is 42 km (26 mi).

Construction of the first 9.6 km section forming the bypass of Pabianice began in 2010. It opened in two stages, in May 2012 and July 2012. Another 4.1 km extension to the south connects it to the S8 expressway. This extension opened to traffic in April 2014. The tender for building the remaining 27 km was opened on 2 October 2015, with completion expected around 2019. However, it was cancelled and reopened in 2017. Contracts were signed in 2019, and the northern section was completed and opened in July 2023.

== Route description ==
Country	Voivodeship	Location	km	mi	Exit	Name	Destinations	Notes
Poland	Łódź Voivodeship	Słowik, Łódź Voivodeship			—	Słowik	DK 91	Planned roundabout with national road 91 Northern terminus of the expressway
Poland	Łódź Voivodeship	Emilia, Łódź Voivodeship			—	Emilia	A 2 / E30 – Poznań / Warsaw A 1 / E75	Part of the interchange belonging to the expressway is under construction The interchange will connect all the three routes by a roundabout – see on OpenStreetMap Access to motorway A1 via motorway A2 towards Warsaw
Poland	Łódź Voivodeship	Zgierz			—	Lućmierz	DW 702 – Łódź / Kutno	Planned junction
Poland	Łódź Voivodeship	Zgierz			—	Zgierz Zachód	DK 71 – Stryków / Aleksandrów Łódzki	
Poland	Łódź Voivodeship	Łódź			—	Aleksandrów Łódzki	DK 71 – Aleksandrów Łódzki Junction located partially in the city of Łódź and Gmina Aleksandrów Łódzki	
Poland	Łódź Voivodeship	Łódź			—	Konstantynów Łódzki	local road (former national road 71) – Aleksandrów Łódzki / Pabianice	Junction located partially in the city of Łódź and the town of Konstantyów Łódzki
Poland	Łódź Voivodeship	Łódź			—	Łódź Retkinia	local road – Pabianice, Konstantynów Łódzki / Łódź-Retkinia, Airport	Access to Maratońska Street (Polish: Ulica Maratońska) in Łódź
Poland	Łódź Voivodeship	Szynkielew Trzeci			—	Łódź Lublinek	DK 14 – Airport, Górna, Chojny	Górna and Chojny are administrative districts in Łódź Until 2022 this was the temporary terminus
Poland	Łódź Voivodeship	Szynkielew			—	Pabianice Północ	local road (former national road 71) – Zgierz / Pabianice	Północ means north
Poland	Łódź Voivodeship	Gmina Dobroń			—	Dobroń	DW 482 – Łask / Pabianice	
Poland	Łódź Voivodeship	Gmina Dobroń			—	Róża	S 8 / E67 – Warsaw / Wrocław; DK 12 – Piotrków Trybunalski / Sieradz	Trumpet interchange Concurrency of expressway S8 and national road 12
1.000 mi = 1.609 km; 1.000 km = 0.621 mi: Closed/former; Concurrency terminus; Proposed; Tolled; Route transition; Unopened
