= Lućmierz-Las =

- Village
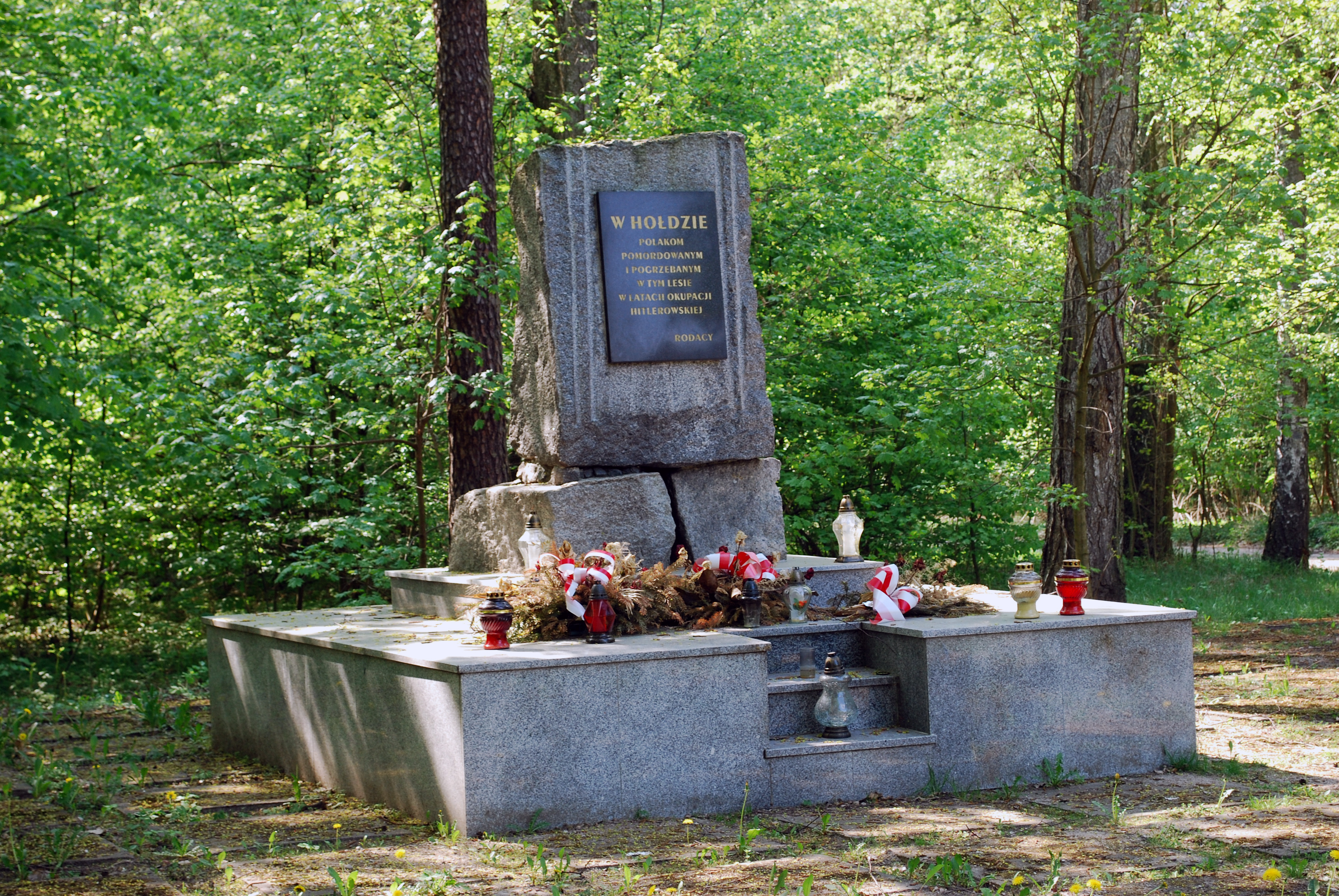
- Memorial to World War II victims

- Location within Poland
- Coordinates: 51°53′37″N 19°22′6″E
- Country: Poland
- Voivodeship: Łódź
- County: Zgierz
- Gmina: Zgierz
- Population: 20

Lućmierz-Las (pronounced [ˈlut͡ɕmjɛʂ ˈlas], Lućmierz Forest) is a village in the administrative district of Gmina Zgierz, within Zgierz County, Łódź Voivodeship, in central Poland.

Along with the neighbouring settlement of Lućmierz-Ośrodek the village forms the Sołectwo Lućmierz. The first mention of Lućmierz appeared in 1391.

== World War II history ==
During the occupation of Poland in World War II, Lućmierz-Las was the location of secret executions of Jews and Poles by Nazi German Einsatzgruppen helped by Selbstschutz executioners already since 1939. It is estimated that up to 30,000 people were murdered there in mass executions beginning with Intelligenzaktion Litzmannstadt and then continued with the killings of inmates of the Radogoszcz prison and Jews from the Łódź Ghetto. After the war, a memorial has been built there to commemorate victims buried in mass graves.

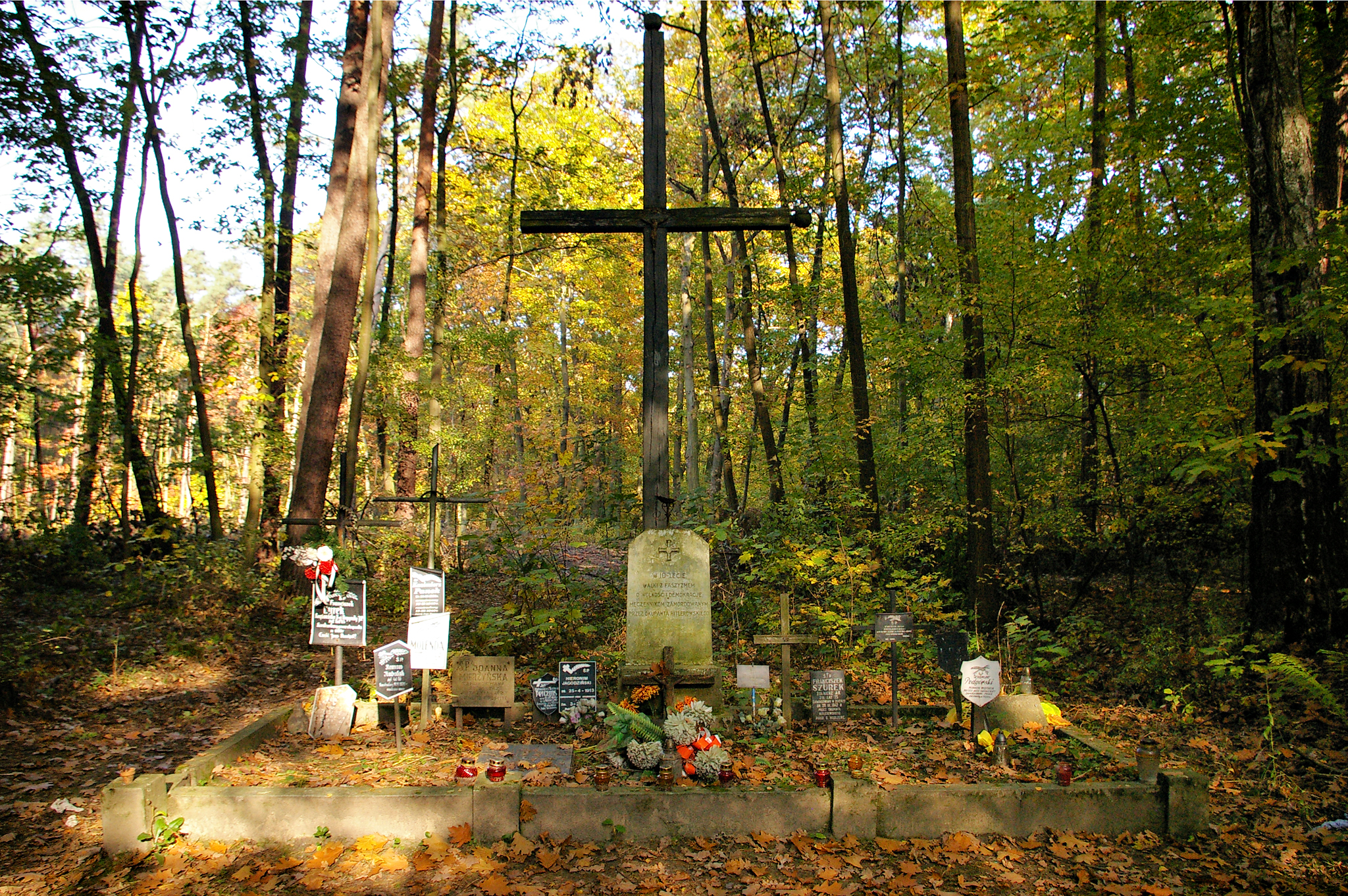
One of forest mass graves at Lućmierz-Las
