= Krzemień (disambiguation) =

Krzemień is a peak in the Bieszczady mountains in south-east Poland.

Krzemień may also refer to:

- Krzemień, Łódź Voivodeship (central Poland)
- Krzemień, Białobrzegi County in Masovian Voivodeship (east-central Poland)
- Krzemień, Maków County in Masovian Voivodeship (east-central Poland)
- Krzemień, West Pomeranian Voivodeship (north-west Poland)
- Krzemien., the standard author abbreviation for Polish botanist and microbiologist Helena Krzemieniewska (1878-1966)
