= Moszczenica =

Moszczenica may refer to the following places:

- Moszczenica, Bochnia County in Lesser Poland Voivodeship (south Poland)
- Moszczenica, Piotrków County in Łódź Voivodeship (central Poland)
- Moszczenica, Zgierz County in Łódź Voivodeship (central Poland)
- Moszczenica, Gorlice County in Lesser Poland Voivodeship (south Poland)
- Moszczenica, Pomeranian Voivodeship (north Poland)
- Moszczenica, Jastrzębie-Zdrój in Silesian Voivodeship (south Poland)
- Moszczenica (river) in Łódź Voivodeship (central Poland)
