= Cyprianów =

- Village
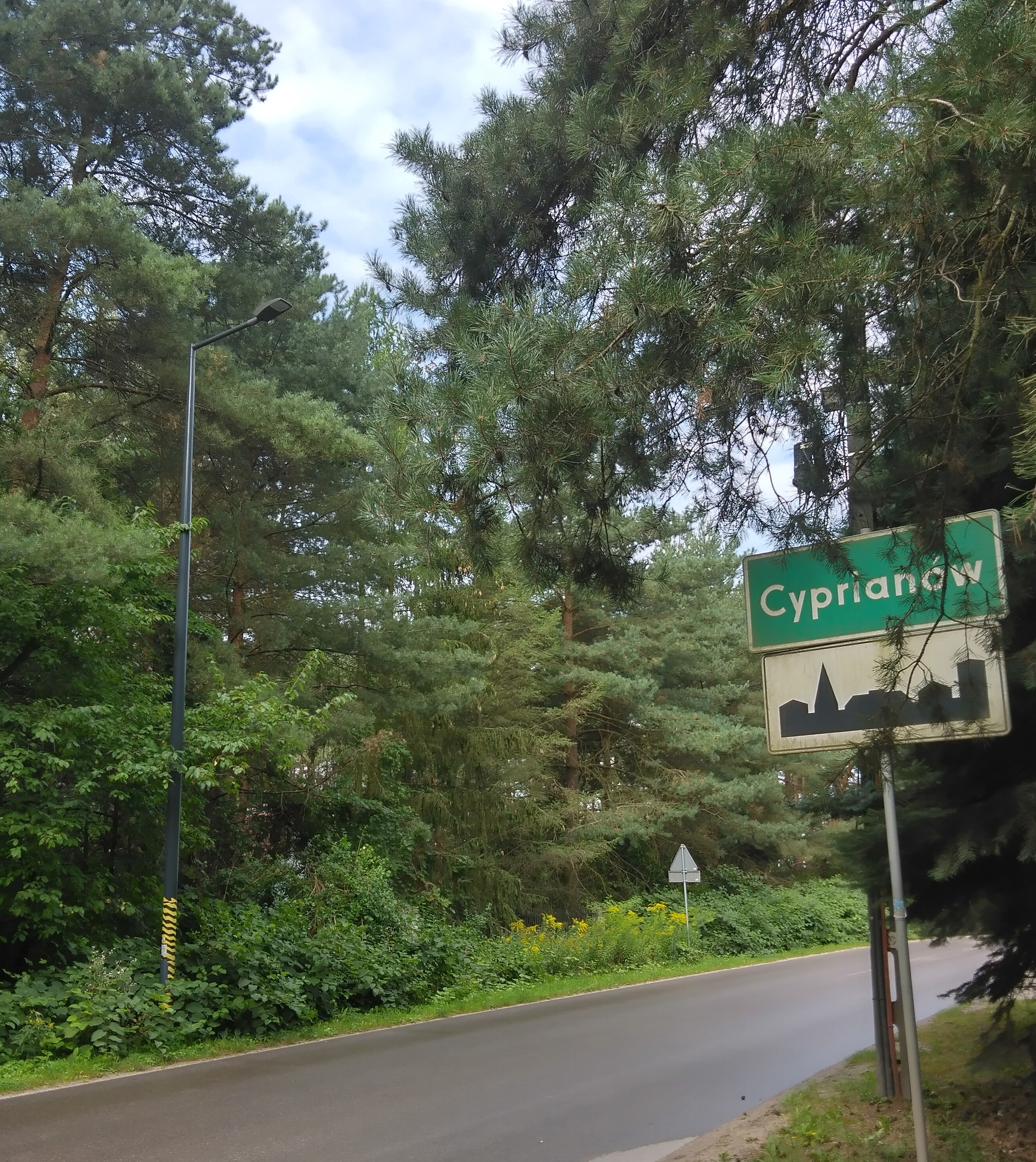

- Location within Poland
- Coordinates: 51°55′17″N 19°28′17″E
- Country: Poland
- Voivodeship: Łódź
- County: Zgierz
- Gmina: Zgierz
- Population: 40

Cyprianów [t͡sɨˈprjanuf] is a village in the administrative district of Gmina Zgierz, within Zgierz County, Łódź Voivodeship, in central Poland.
