= Dąbrówka-Sowice =

- Village
- Location within Poland
- Coordinates: 51°54′0″N 19°26′25″E
- Country: Poland
- Voivodeship: Łódź
- County: Zgierz
- Gmina: Zgierz

Dąbrówka-Sowice [dɔmˈbrufka sɔˈvit͡sɛ] is a village in the administrative district of Gmina Zgierz, within Zgierz County, Łódź Voivodeship, in central Poland.
