= Wiktorów, Zgierz County =

Wiktorów
- Village
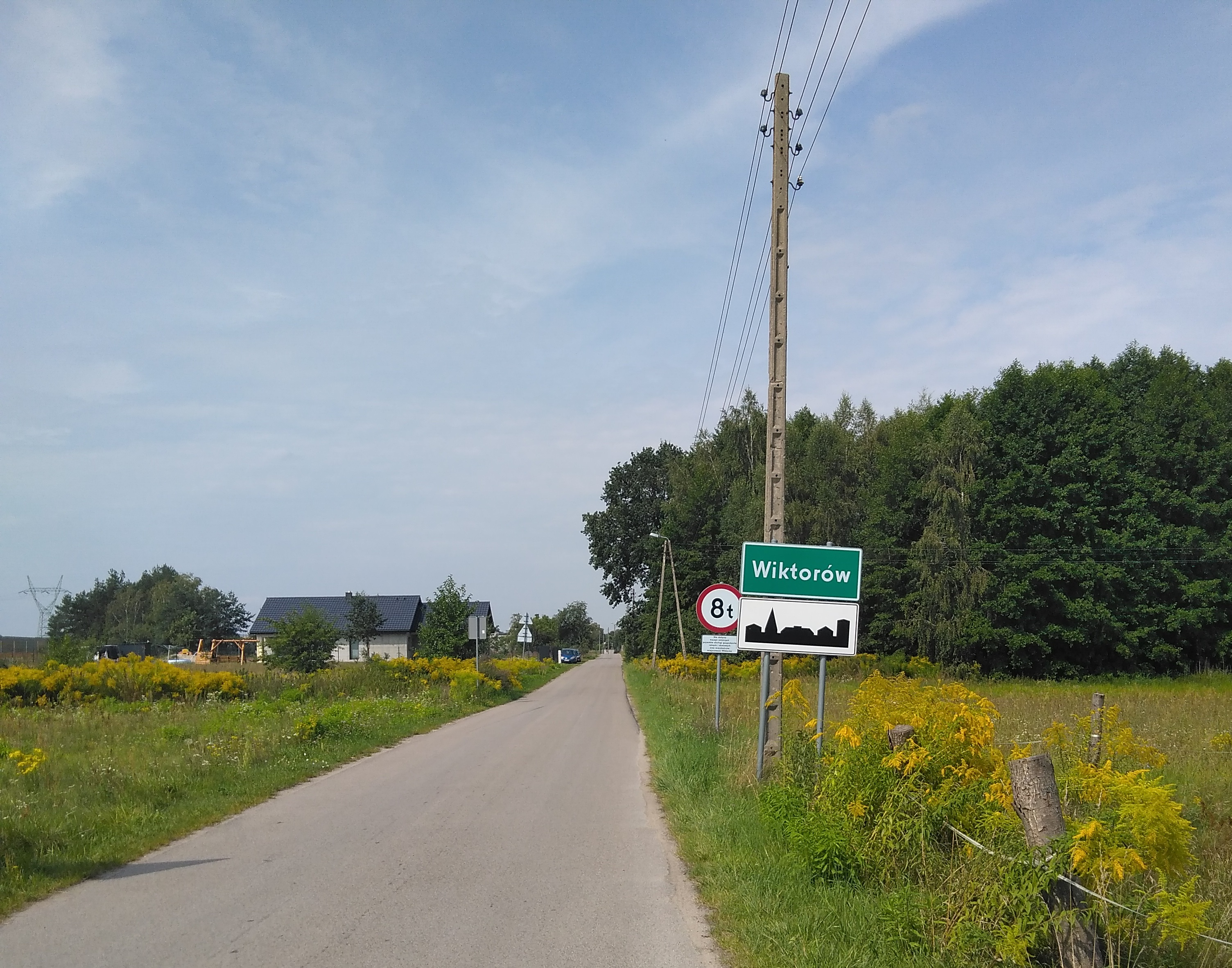

- Location within Poland
- Coordinates: 51°55′N 19°18′E
- Country: Poland
- Voivodeship: Łódź
- County: Zgierz
- Gmina: Zgierz

Wiktorów [vikˈtɔruf] is a village in the administrative district of Gmina Zgierz, within Zgierz County, Łódź Voivodeship, in central Poland.
