= Ostrów, Gmina Zgierz =

Ostrów
- Village
- Location within Poland
- Coordinates: 51°56′29″N 19°24′56″E
- Country: Poland
- Voivodeship: Łódź
- County: Zgierz
- Gmina: Zgierz

Ostrów [ˈɔstruf] is a village in the administrative district of Gmina Zgierz, within Zgierz County, Łódź Voivodeship, in central Poland.
