= Bądków, Łódź Voivodeship =

Bądków
- Village
- Location within Poland
- Coordinates: 51°57′N 19°26′E
- Country: Poland
- Voivodeship: Łódź
- County: Zgierz
- Gmina: Zgierz

Population
  - Total: 126
- Time zone: UTC+1 (CET)
  - Summer (DST): UTC+2 (CEST)
- Vehicle registration: EZG
- Primary airport: Łódź Władysław Reymont Airport

Bądków [ˈbɔntkuf] is a village in the administrative district of Gmina Zgierz, within Zgierz County, Łódź Voivodeship, in central Poland.

== History ==
Bądków was a private village of Polish nobility, administratively located in the Łęczyca County in the Łęczyca Voivodeship in the Greater Poland Province of the Kingdom of Poland.

During the German Invasion of Poland in 1939, German forces mass murdered 22 Poles by burning them alive. The victims included three elderly people (up to 90 years old) and one child. The Poles were imprisoned in a barn that was set on fire. Those who tried to escape from the fire were shot by the Germans during the escape attempt (see Nazi crimes against the Polish nation). In 1941, the occupiers also carried out expulsions of Poles, who were deported to forced labour in Germany, while their houses and farms were handed over to German colonists as part of the Lebensraum policy.
