= Leonardów, Łódź Voivodeship =

Leonardów
- Village
- Location within Poland
- Coordinates: 51°52′23″N 19°30′52″E
- Country: Poland
- Voivodeship: Łódź
- County: Zgierz
- Gmina: Zgierz
- Population: 60

Leonardów [lɛɔˈnarduf] is a village in the administrative district of Gmina Zgierz, within Zgierz County, Łódź Voivodeship, in central Poland.
