= Dąbrówka-Marianka =

- Village
- Location within Poland
- Coordinates: 51°53′14″N 19°27′7″E
- Country: Poland
- Voivodeship: Łódź
- County: Zgierz
- Gmina: Zgierz
- Population: 40

Dąbrówka-Marianka [dɔmˈbrufka maˈrjanka] is a village in the administrative district of Gmina Zgierz, within Zgierz County, Łódź Voivodeship, in central Poland.
