= Szczawin Mały =

- Village
- Location within Poland
- Coordinates: 51°54′23″N 19°29′13″E
- Country: Poland
- Voivodeship: Łódź
- County: Zgierz
- Gmina: Zgierz

Szczawin Mały [ˈʂt͡ʂavin ˈmawɨ] is a village in the administrative district of Gmina Zgierz, within Zgierz County, Łódź Voivodeship, in central Poland.
