= Janów, Gmina Zgierz =

Janów
- Village
- Location within Poland
- Coordinates: 51°52′12″N 19°29′14″E
- Country: Poland
- Voivodeship: Łódź
- County: Zgierz
- Gmina: Zgierz
- Population: 60

Janów [ˈjanuf] is a village in the administrative district of Gmina Zgierz, within Zgierz County, Łódź Voivodeship, in central Poland.
