= Gieczno =

- Village
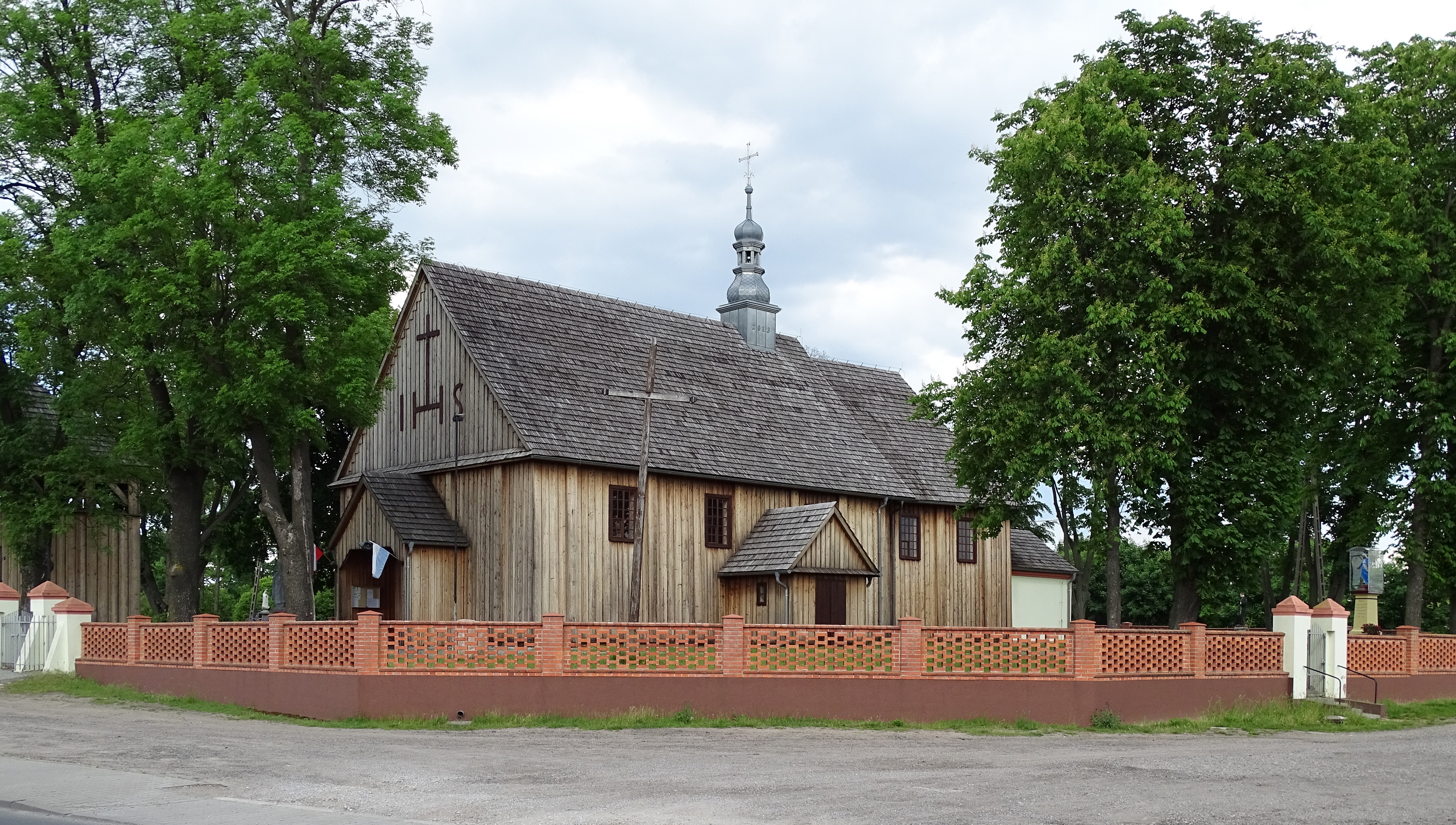
- Parish church from 1717

- Location within Poland
- Coordinates: 51°59′N 19°27′E
- Country: Poland
- Voivodeship: Łódź
- County: Zgierz
- Gmina: Zgierz
- Population: 270

Gieczno [ˈɡʲɛt͡ʂnɔ] is a village in the administrative district of Gmina Zgierz, within Zgierz County, Łódź Voivodeship, in central Poland.
