= Jedlicze A =

- Village
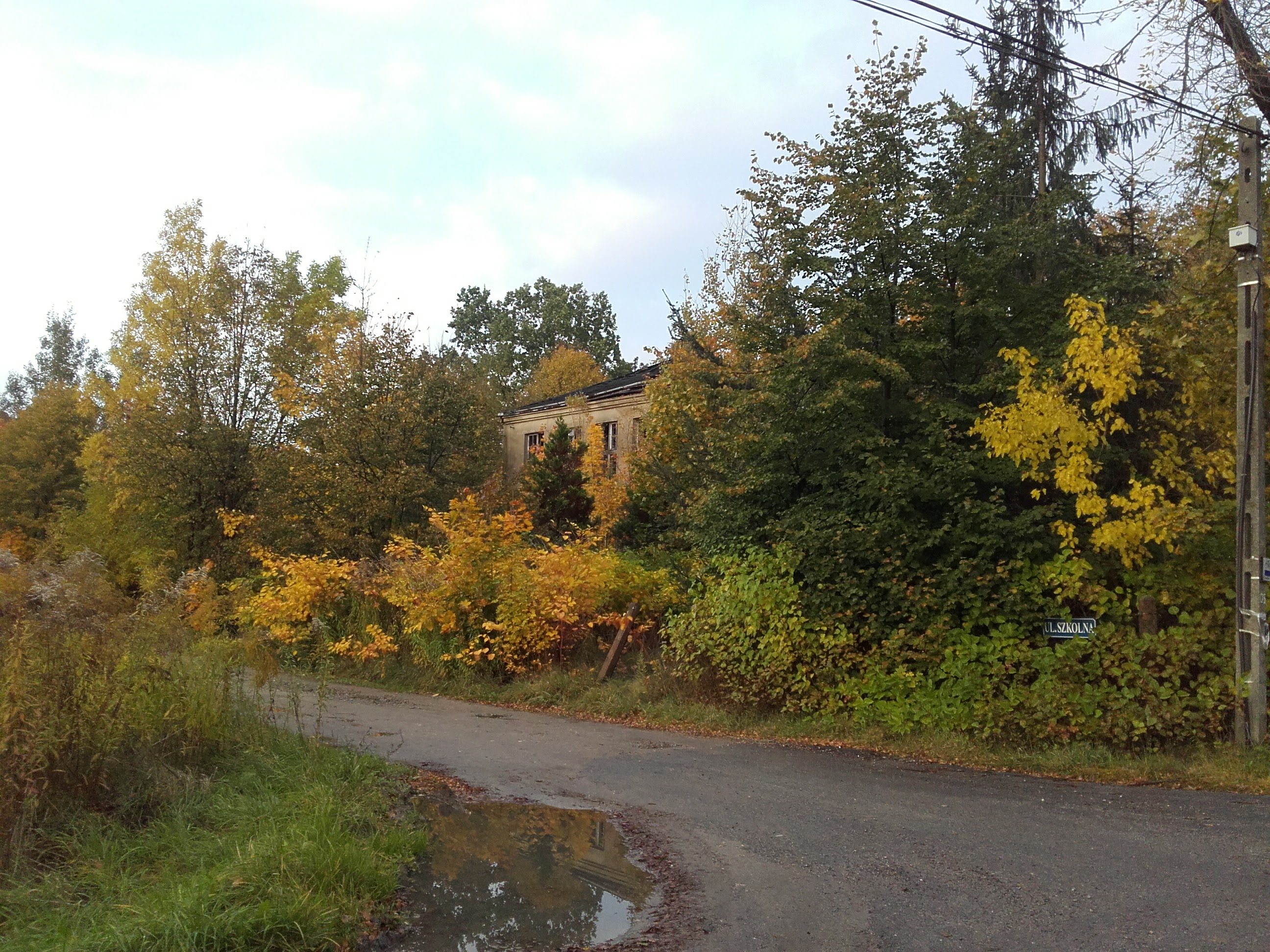

- Location within Poland
- Coordinates: 51°52′N 19°19′E
- Country: Poland
- Voivodeship: Łódź
- County: Zgierz
- Gmina: Zgierz

Jedlicze A is a village in the administrative district of Gmina Zgierz, within Zgierz County, Łódź Voivodeship, in central Poland.
