= Glinnik, Gmina Zgierz =

Glinnik
- Village
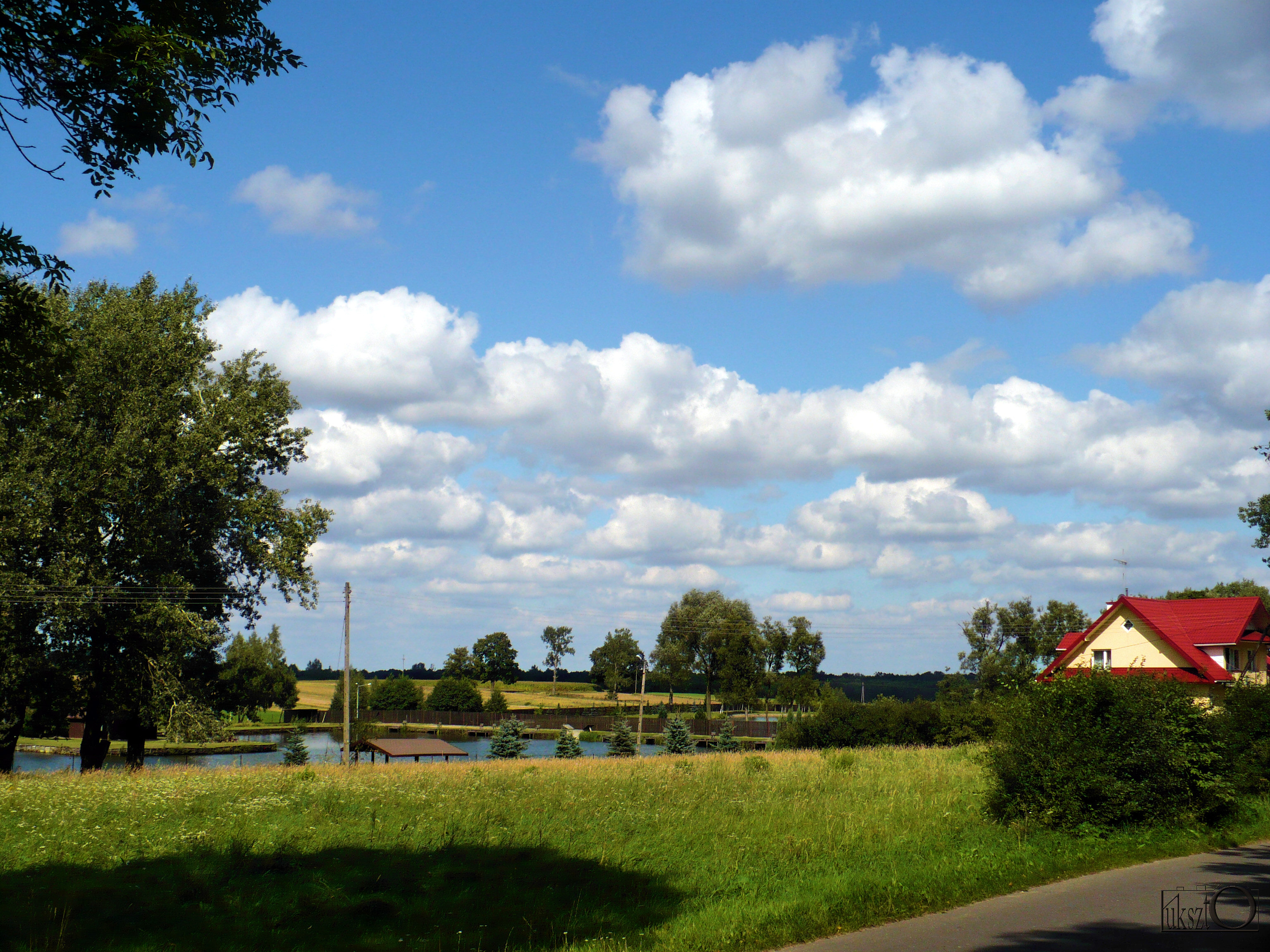

- Location within Poland
- Coordinates: 51°52′58″N 19°28′39″E
- Country: Poland
- Voivodeship: Łódź
- County: Zgierz
- Gmina: Zgierz
- Population: 70

Glinnik [ˈɡlinnik] (German: Lehmfeld; 1943-1945) is a village in the administrative district of Gmina Zgierz, within Zgierz County, Łódź Voivodeship, in central Poland.

In 2005 the village had a population of 70. It is the seat of the sołectwo of Glinnik, which also includes the villages Palestyna, Samotnik, Siedlisko and Wołyń. The sołectwo had a population of 224 in 2005.
