= Stare Brachowice =

- Village
- Location within Poland
- Coordinates: 51°59′N 19°24′E
- Country: Poland
- Voivodeship: Łódź
- County: Zgierz
- Gmina: Zgierz

Stare Brachowice [ˈstarɛ braxɔˈvit͡sɛ] is a village in the administrative district of Gmina Zgierz, within Zgierz County, Łódź Voivodeship, in central Poland.
