= Kębliny =

- Village
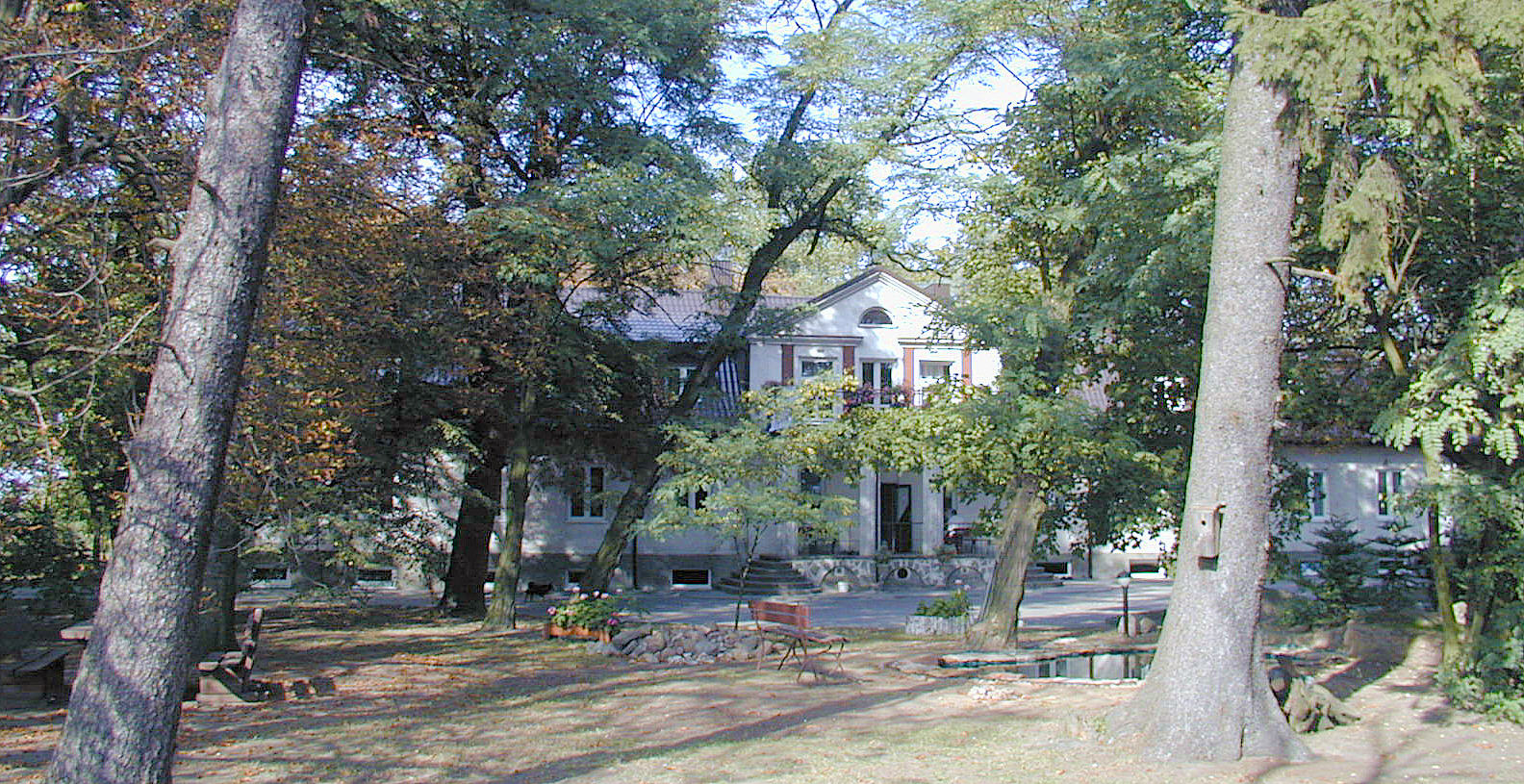
- Manor

- Location within Poland
- Coordinates: 51°56′N 19°31′E
- Country: Poland
- Voivodeship: Łódź
- County: Zgierz
- Gmina: Zgierz
- Elevation: 145 m (476 ft)
- Population: 290

Kębliny [kɛmˈblinɨ] is a village in the administrative district of Gmina Zgierz, within Zgierz County, Łódź Voivodeship, in central Poland.
