= Marcjanka =

Marcjanka may refer to the following places in Poland:

- Marcjanka, Łódź Voivodeship (central Poland)
- Marcjanka, Masovian Voivodeship (east-central Poland)
