= Rozalinów =

- Village
- Location within Poland
- Coordinates: 51°52′50″N 19°27′14″E
- Country: Poland
- Voivodeship: Łódź
- County: Zgierz
- Gmina: Zgierz
- Population: 70

Rozalinów [rɔzaˈlinuf] is a village in the administrative district of Gmina Zgierz, within Zgierz County, Łódź Voivodeship, in central Poland.
