= Florianów, Zgierz County =

Florianów
- Village
- Location within Poland
- Coordinates: 51°55′54″N 19°31′2″E
- Country: Poland
- Voivodeship: Łódź
- County: Zgierz
- Gmina: Zgierz

Florianów [flɔˈrjanuf] is a village in the administrative district of Gmina Zgierz, within Zgierz County, Łódź Voivodeship, in central Poland.
