= Siedlisko =

Siedlisko may refer to the following places:

- Siedlisko, Greater Poland Voivodeship (west-central Poland)
- Siedlisko, Łódź Voivodeship (central Poland)
- Siedlisko, Lublin Voivodeship (east Poland)
- Siedlisko, Gmina Maszewo, Krosno County in Lubusz Voivodeship (west Poland)
- Siedlisko, Nowa Sól County in Lubusz Voivodeship (west Poland)
- Siedlisko, Elbląg County in Warmian-Masurian Voivodeship (north Poland)
- Siedlisko, Gołdap County in Warmian-Masurian Voivodeship (north Poland)
