= Moszczenica (river) =

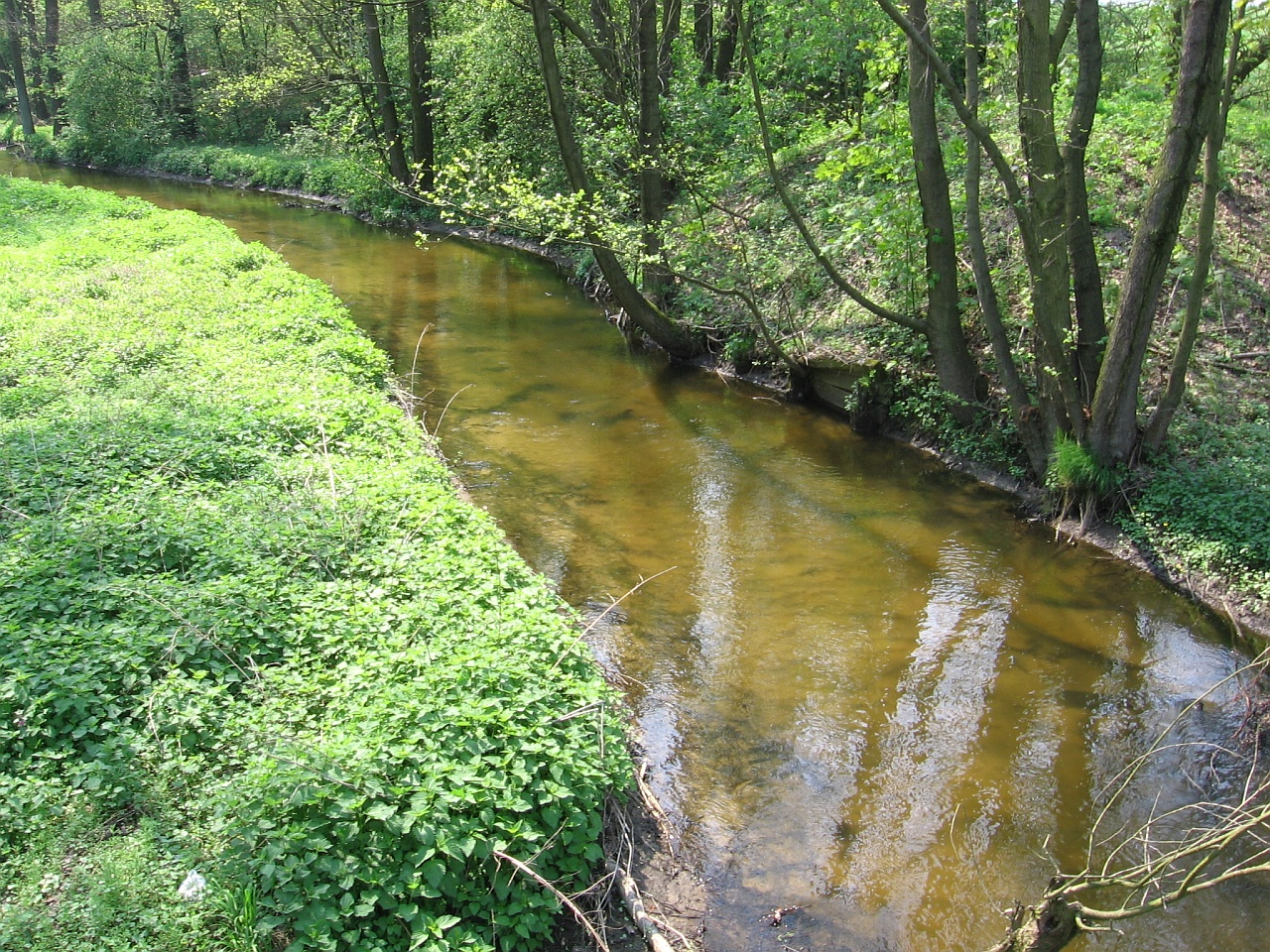
- Moszczenica near Wola Branicka, Zgierz County

Location
- Country: Poland
- Voivodeship: Łódź

Physical characteristics
- Source
  - location: east of Byszewy, Łódź East County
  - coordinates: 51°49′17.5″N 19°38′00.2″E
  - elevation: 190 m (620 ft)
- Mouth: Bzura
  - location: south of Orłów-Kolonia, Kutno County
  - coordinates: 52.1317°N 19.5638°E
  - elevation: 93.5 m (307 ft)
- Length: 55.08 km (34.23 mi)
- Basin size: 515 km^{2} (199 mi^{2})

Basin features
- Progression: Bzura→ Vistula→ Baltic Sea

Moszczenica is a river of Poland, a tributary of the Bzura near Orłów-Kolonia.
