= Swoboda, Zgierz County =

Swoboda
- Village
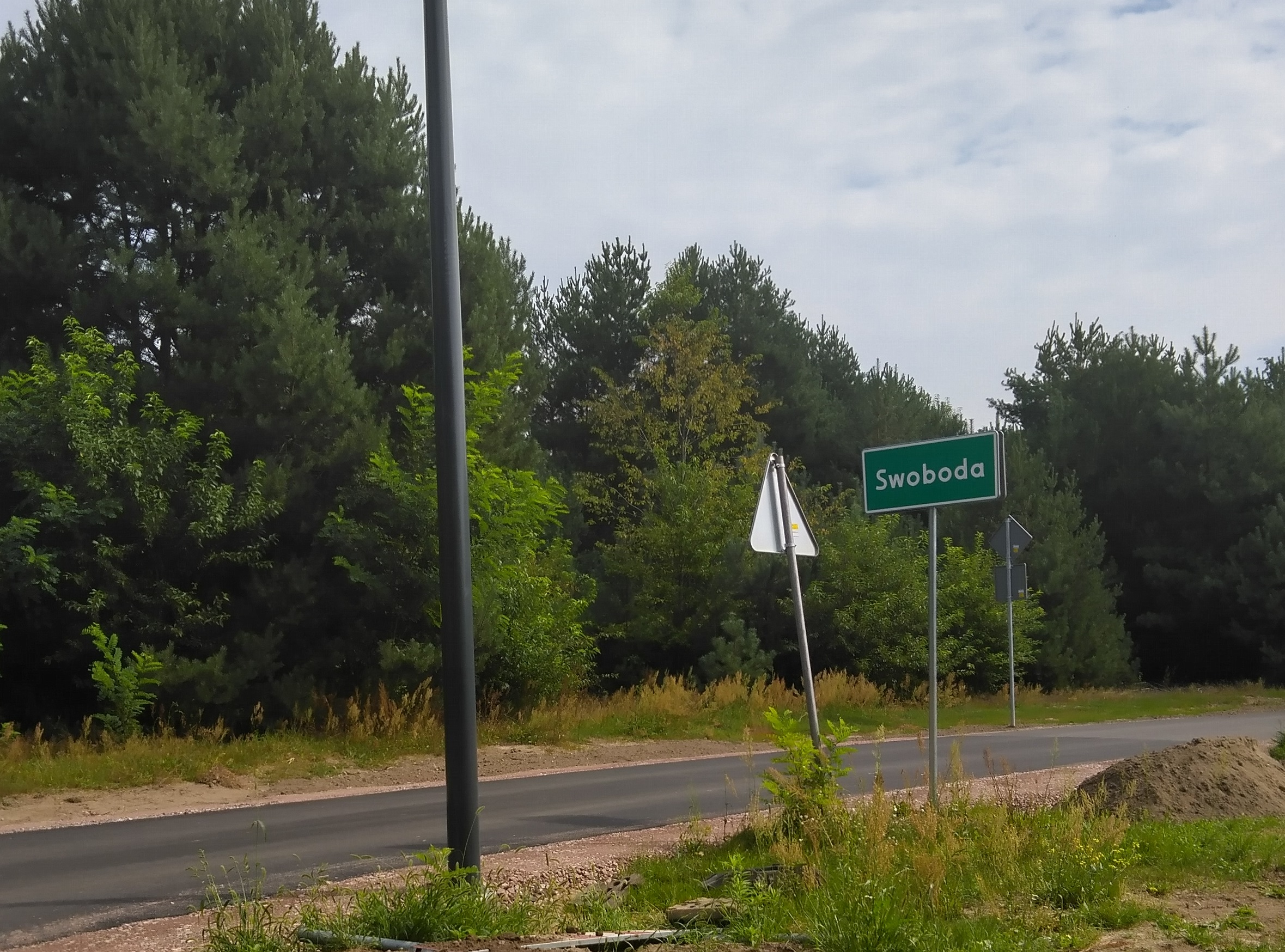

- Location within Poland
- Coordinates: 51°56′31″N 19°26′0″E
- Country: Poland
- Voivodeship: Łódź
- County: Zgierz
- Gmina: Zgierz
- Population: 60

Swoboda [sfɔˈbɔda] is a village in the administrative district of Gmina Zgierz, within Zgierz County, Łódź Voivodeship, in central Poland.
