= Besiekierz Rudny =

- Village
- Location within Poland
- Coordinates: 51°57′N 19°28′E
- Country: Poland
- Voivodeship: Łódź
- County: Zgierz
- Gmina: Zgierz

Besiekierz Rudny [bɛˈɕɛkʲɛʂ ˈrudnɨ] is a village in the administrative district of Gmina Zgierz, within Zgierz County, Łódź Voivodeship, in central Poland.
