= Samotnik, Łódź Voivodeship =

Samotnik
- Village
- Location within Poland
- Coordinates: 51°52′30″N 19°28′46″E
- Country: Poland
- Voivodeship: Łódź
- County: Zgierz
- Gmina: Zgierz

Samotnik [saˈmɔtnik] is a village in the administrative district of Gmina Zgierz, within Zgierz County, Łódź Voivodeship, in central Poland.
