= Astachowice =

- Village
- Location within Poland
- Coordinates: 51°58′N 19°26′E
- Country: Poland
- Voivodeship: Łódź
- County: Zgierz
- Gmina: Zgierz

Astachowice [astaxɔˈvit͡sɛ] is a village in the administrative district of Gmina Zgierz, within Zgierz County, Łódź Voivodeship, in central Poland.
