= Śladków Górny =

- Village
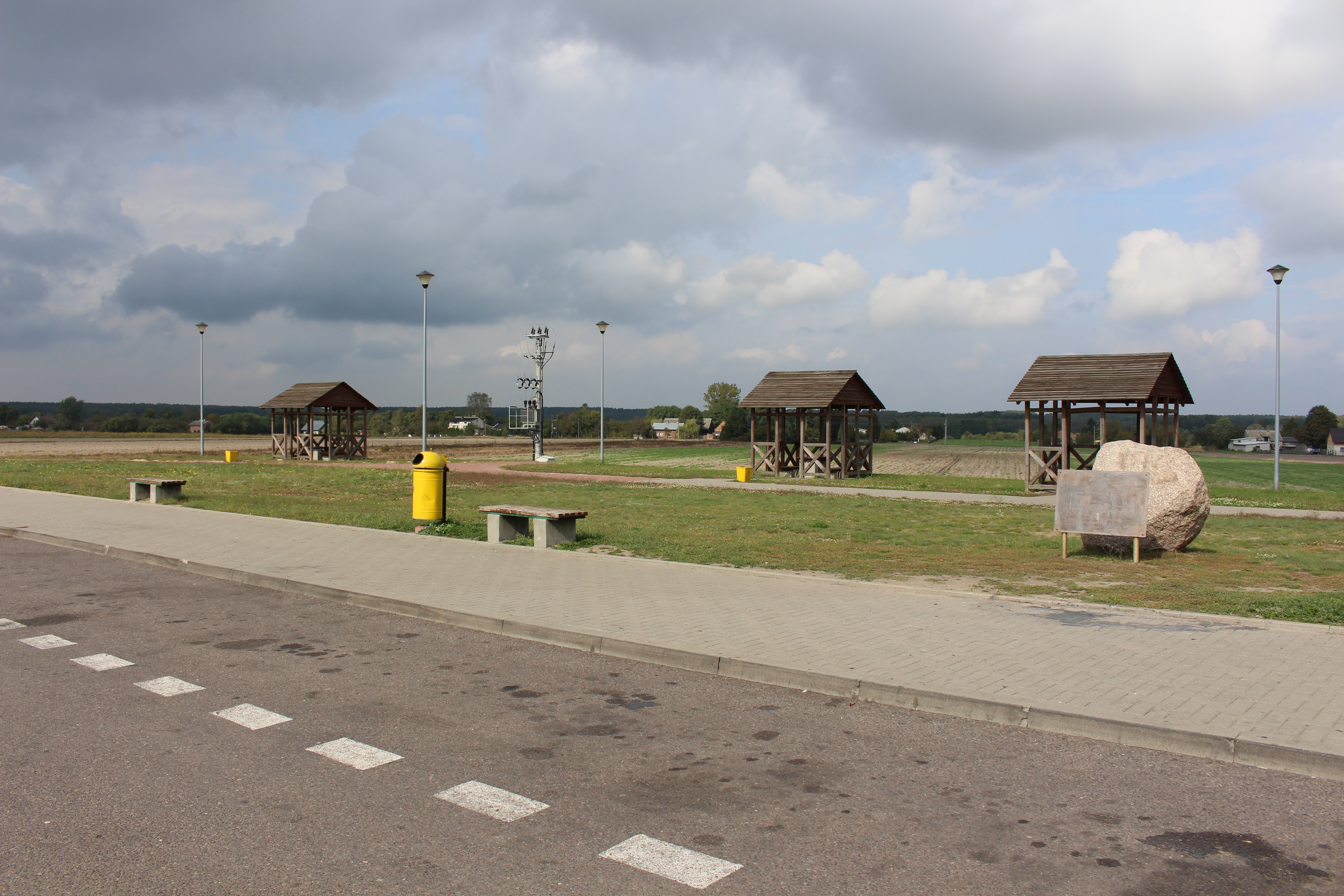

- Location within Poland
- Coordinates: 52°0′N 19°24′E
- Country: Poland
- Voivodeship: Łódź
- County: Zgierz
- Gmina: Zgierz

Śladków Górny [ˈɕlatkuf ˈɡurnɨ] is a village in the administrative district of Gmina Zgierz, within Zgierz County, Łódź Voivodeship, in central Poland.
