= Ustronie =

Ustronie may refer to the following places in Poland:

- Ustronie, Lubin County in Lower Silesian Voivodeship (south-west Poland)
- Ustronie, Lwówek County in Lower Silesian Voivodeship (south-west Poland)
- Ustronie, Kuyavian-Pomeranian Voivodeship (north-central Poland)
- Ustronie, Łódź Voivodeship (central Poland)
- Ustronie, Gostyń County in Greater Poland Voivodeship (west-central Poland)
- Ustronie, Leszno County in Greater Poland Voivodeship (west-central Poland)
- Ustronie, Lubusz Voivodeship (west Poland)
- Ustronie, Pomeranian Voivodeship (north Poland)
- Ustronie, Warmian-Masurian Voivodeship (north Poland)
