= Zimna Woda, Zgierz County =

Zimna Woda
- Village
- Location within Poland
- Coordinates: 51°55′42″N 19°19′26″E
- Country: Poland
- Voivodeship: Łódź
- County: Zgierz
- Gmina: Zgierz
- Population: 30

Zimna Woda [ˈʑimna ˈvɔda] is a village in the administrative district of Gmina Zgierz, within Zgierz County, Łódź Voivodeship, in central Poland.
