= Kania Góra =

- Village
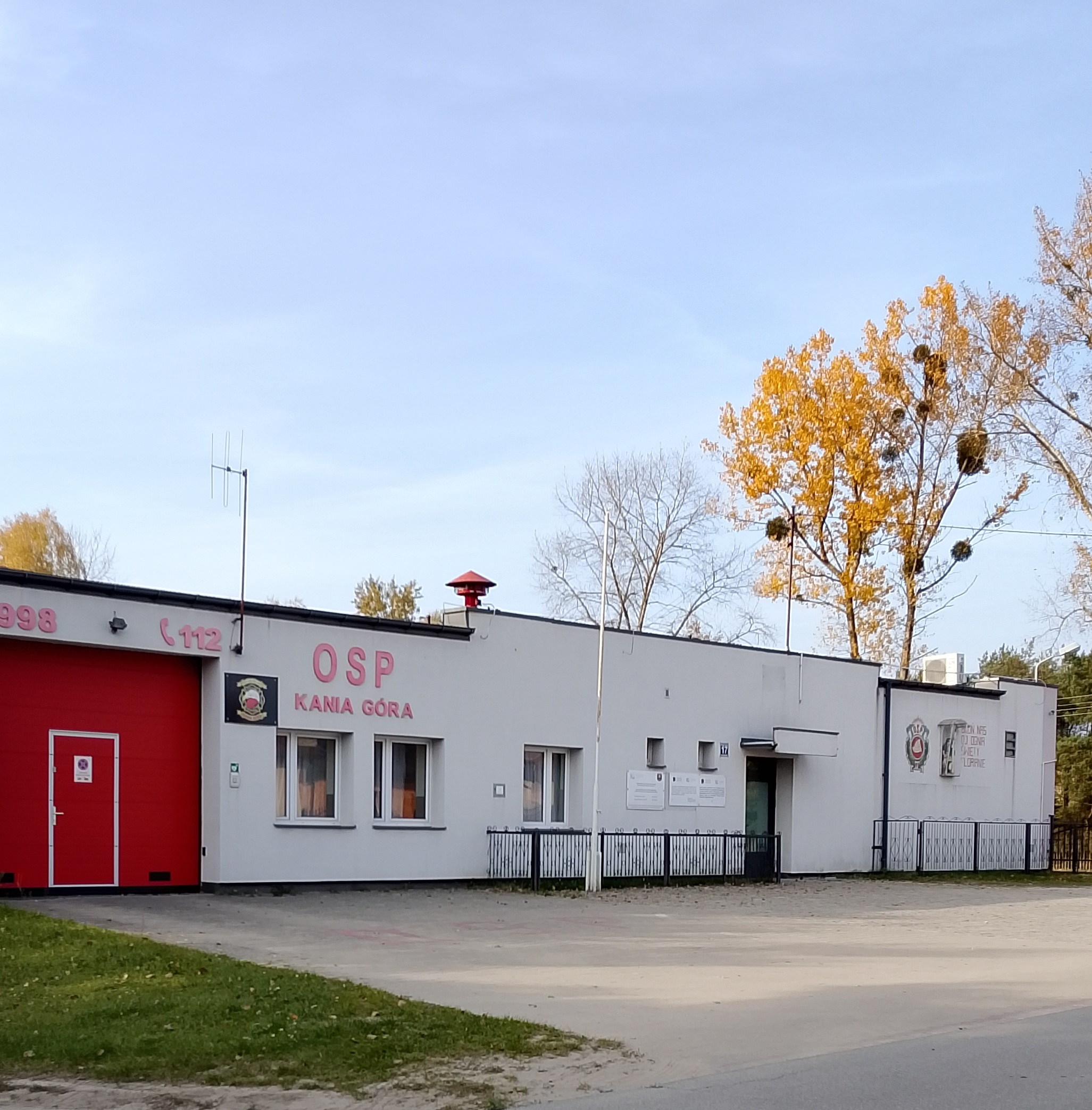

- Location within Poland
- Coordinates: 51°56′N 19°22′E
- Country: Poland
- Voivodeship: Łódź
- County: Zgierz
- Gmina: Zgierz
- Population: 130

Kania Góra [ˈkaɲa ˈɡura] is a village in the administrative district of Gmina Zgierz, within Zgierz County, Łódź Voivodeship, in central Poland.
