= Wola Branicka-Kolonia =

- Village
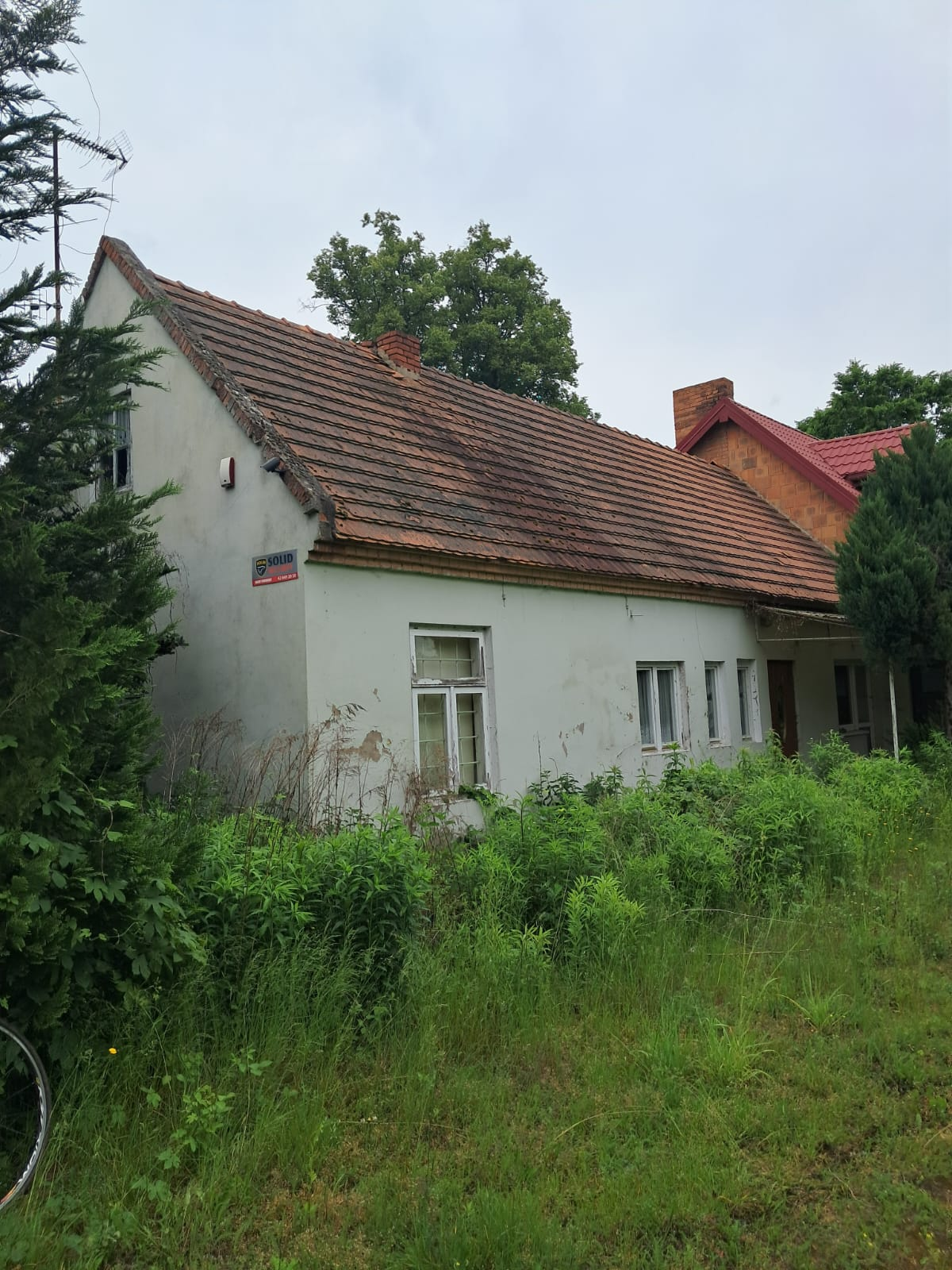

- Location within Poland
- Coordinates: 51°56′34″N 19°28′13″E
- Country: Poland
- Voivodeship: Łódź
- County: Zgierz
- Gmina: Zgierz

Wola Branicka-Kolonia [ˈvɔla braˈnit͡ska kɔˈlɔɲa] is a village in the administrative district of Gmina Zgierz, within Zgierz County, Łódź Voivodeship, in central Poland.
