= Głowa, Łódź Voivodeship =

Głowa
- Village
- Location within Poland
- Coordinates: 51°55′15″N 19°26′39″E
- Country: Poland
- Voivodeship: Łódź
- County: Zgierz
- Gmina: Zgierz
- Population: 110

Głowa [ˈɡwɔva] is a village in the administrative district of Gmina Zgierz, within Zgierz County, Łódź Voivodeship, in central Poland.
