= Szczawin-Kolonia =

- Village
- Location within Poland
- Coordinates: 51°53′44″N 19°28′49″E
- Country: Poland
- Voivodeship: Łódź
- County: Zgierz
- Gmina: Zgierz
- Population: 90

Szczawin-Kolonia [ˈʂt͡ʂavin kɔˈlɔɲa] is a village in the administrative district of Gmina Zgierz, within Zgierz County, Łódź Voivodeship, in central Poland.
