= Maciejów, Zgierz County =

Maciejów
- Village
- Location within Poland
- Coordinates: 51°52′N 19°27′E
- Country: Poland
- Voivodeship: Łódź
- County: Zgierz
- Gmina: Zgierz

Maciejów [maˈt͡ɕɛjuf] is a village in the administrative district of Gmina Zgierz, within Zgierz County, Łódź Voivodeship, in central Poland.
