= Kwilno, Łódź Voivodeship =

Kwilno
- Village
- Location within Poland
- Coordinates: 51°59′N 19°30′E
- Country: Poland
- Voivodeship: Łódź
- County: Zgierz
- Gmina: Zgierz

Kwilno [ˈkfilnɔ] is a village in the administrative district of Gmina Zgierz, within Zgierz County, Łódź Voivodeship, in central Poland.
