= Adolfów, Łódź Voivodeship =

Adolfów
- Village
- Location within Poland
- Coordinates: 51°56′7″N 19°21′24″E
- Country: Poland
- Voivodeship: Łódź
- County: Zgierz
- Gmina: Zgierz
- Population: 60

Adolfów [aˈdɔlfuf] is a village in the administrative district of Gmina Zgierz, within Zgierz County, Łódź Voivodeship, in central Poland.
