= Ciosny-Kolonia =

- Village
- Location within Poland
- Coordinates: 51°55′01″N 19°22′32″E
- Country: Poland
- Voivodeship: Łódź
- County: Zgierz
- Gmina: Zgierz

Ciosny-Kolonia [ˈt͡ɕɔsnɨ kɔˈlɔɲa] is a village in the administrative district of Gmina Zgierz, within Zgierz County, Łódź Voivodeship, in central Poland.
