= Jasionka =

Jasionka may refer to the following places in Poland:

- Rzeszów-Jasionka Airport
- Jasionka, Lesser Poland Voivodeship (south Poland)
- Jasionka, Łódź Voivodeship (central Poland)
- Jasionka, Lublin Voivodeship (east Poland)
- Jasionka, Masovian Voivodeship (east-central Poland)
- Jasionka, Pomeranian Voivodeship (north Poland)
- Jasionka, Gmina Dukla, Krosno County in Subcarpathian Voivodeship (south-east Poland)
- Jasionka, Rzeszów County in Subcarpathian Voivodeship (south-east Poland)
