= Józefów, Zgierz County =

Józefów
- Village
- Location within Poland
- Coordinates: 51°52′N 19°30′E
- Country: Poland
- Voivodeship: Łódź
- County: Zgierz
- Gmina: Zgierz

Józefów (Polish pronunciation: [juˈzɛfuf]) is a village in the administrative district of Gmina Zgierz, within Zgierz County, Łódź Voivodeship, in central Poland.
