= Dębniak, Zgierz County =

Dębniak
- Village
- Location within Poland
- Coordinates: 51°56′17″N 19°22′54″E
- Country: Poland
- Voivodeship: Łódź
- County: Zgierz
- Gmina: Zgierz
- Population: 60

Dębniak [ˈdɛmbɲak] is a village in the administrative district of Gmina Zgierz, within Zgierz County, Łódź Voivodeship, in central Poland.
