= Władysławów, Zgierz County =

Władysławów
- Village
- Location within Poland
- Coordinates: 51°58′N 19°29′E
- Country: Poland
- Voivodeship: Łódź
- County: Zgierz
- Gmina: Zgierz

Władysławów [vwadɨˈswavuf] is a village in the administrative district of Gmina Zgierz, within Zgierz County, Łódź Voivodeship, in central Poland.
