= Osmolin, Łódź Voivodeship =

Osmolin
- Village
- Location within Poland
- Coordinates: 51°52′15″N 19°29′37″E
- Country: Poland
- Voivodeship: Łódź
- County: Zgierz
- Gmina: Zgierz

Osmolin [ɔsˈmɔlin] is a village in the administrative district of Gmina Zgierz, within Zgierz County, Łódź Voivodeship, in central Poland.
