= Palestyna, Łódź Voivodeship =

Palestyna
- Village
- Location within Poland
- Coordinates: 51°52′43″N 19°29′21″E
- Country: Poland
- Voivodeship: Łódź
- County: Zgierz
- Gmina: Zgierz

Palestyna [palɛsˈtɨna] is a village in the administrative district of Gmina Zgierz, within Zgierz County, Łódź Voivodeship, in central Poland.
