= Leonów, Zgierz County =

Leonów
- Village
- Location within Poland
- Coordinates: 51°54′55″N 19°25′33″E
- Country: Poland
- Voivodeship: Łódź
- County: Zgierz
- Gmina: Zgierz
- Population: 20

Leonów [lɛˈɔnuf] is a village in the administrative district of Gmina Zgierz, within Zgierz County, Łódź Voivodeship, in central Poland.
