= Jeżewo =

Jeżewo may refer to the following places:

- Jeżewo, Świecie County in Kuyavian-Pomeranian Voivodeship (north-central Poland)
- Jeżewo, Żnin County in Kuyavian-Pomeranian Voivodeship (north-central Poland)
- Jeżewo, Łódź Voivodeship (central Poland)
- Jeżewo, Płock County in Masovian Voivodeship (east-central Poland)
- Jeżewo, Płońsk County in Masovian Voivodeship (east-central Poland)
- Jeżewo, Pułtusk County in Masovian Voivodeship (east-central Poland)
- Jeżewo, Sierpc County in Masovian Voivodeship (east-central Poland)
- Jeżewo, Pomeranian Voivodeship (north Poland)
- Jeżewo, Warmian-Masurian Voivodeship (north Poland)
- Jeżewo, West Pomeranian Voivodeship (north-west Poland)
