= Michałów, Zgierz County =

Michałów
- Village
- Location within Poland
- Coordinates: 51°55′44″N 19°29′2″E
- Country: Poland
- Voivodeship: Łódź
- County: Zgierz
- Gmina: Zgierz
- Population: 20

Michałów [miˈxawuf] is a village in the administrative district of Gmina Zgierz, within Zgierz County, Łódź Voivodeship, in central Poland.
