= Stefanów, Zgierz County =

Stefanów
- Village
- Location within Poland
- Coordinates: 51°54′58″N 19°25′57″E
- Country: Poland
- Voivodeship: Łódź
- County: Zgierz
- Gmina: Zgierz

Stefanów [stɛˈfanuf] is a village in the administrative district of Gmina Zgierz, within Zgierz County, Łódź Voivodeship, in central Poland.
