= Dąbrówka Wielka =

Dąbrówka Wielka may refer to the following places:

- Dąbrówka Wielka, Łódź Voivodeship (central Poland)
- Dąbrówka Wielka, Pomeranian Voivodeship (north Poland)
- Dąbrówka Wielka, Warmian-Masurian Voivodeship (north Poland)
