= Jedlicze B =

- Village
- Location within Poland
- Coordinates: 51°52′N 19°18′E
- Country: Poland
- Voivodeship: Łódź
- County: Zgierz
- Gmina: Zgierz
- Website: http://www.grotniki.info

Jedlicze B is a village in the administrative district of Gmina Zgierz, within Zgierz County, Łódź Voivodeship, in central Poland.
