= Smardzew, Zgierz County =

Smardzew
- Village
- Location within Poland
- Coordinates: 51°52′29″N 19°28′13″E
- Country: Poland
- Voivodeship: Łódź
- County: Zgierz
- Gmina: Zgierz
- Population: 140

Smardzew [ˈsmard͡zɛf] is a village in the administrative district of Gmina Zgierz, within Zgierz County, Łódź Voivodeship, in central Poland.
