= Dąbrówka-Malice =

- Village
- Location within Poland
- Coordinates: 51°53′09″N 19°24′43″E
- Country: Poland
- Voivodeship: Łódź
- County: Zgierz
- Gmina: Zgierz

Dąbrówka-Malice [dɔmˈbrufka maˈlit͡sɛ] is a village in the administrative district of Gmina Zgierz, within Zgierz County, Łódź Voivodeship, in central Poland.
