= Szczawin =

Szczawin may refer to the following places in Poland:

- Szczawin, Lower Silesian Voivodeship (south-west Poland)
- Szczawin, Łódź Voivodeship (central Poland)
- Szczawin, Płońsk County in Masovian Voivodeship (east-central Poland)
- Szczawin, Ostrołęka County in Masovian Voivodeship (east-central Poland)
