= Szczawin Kościelny, Łódź Voivodeship =

Szczawin Kościelny
- Village
- Location within Poland
- Coordinates: 51°53′53″N 19°29′21″E
- Country: Poland
- Voivodeship: Łódź
- County: Zgierz
- Gmina: Zgierz
- Population: 630

Szczawin Kościelny [ˈʂt͡ʂavin kɔɕˈt͡ɕɛlnɨ] is a village in the administrative district of Gmina Zgierz, within Zgierz County, Łódź Voivodeship, in central Poland.
