= Grabiszew, Zgierz County =

Grabiszew
- Village
- Location within Poland
- Coordinates: 51°58′N 19°24′E
- Country: Poland
- Voivodeship: Łódź
- County: Zgierz
- Gmina: Zgierz

Grabiszew [ɡraˈbiʂɛf] is a village in the administrative district of Gmina Zgierz, within Zgierz County, Łódź Voivodeship, in central Poland.
