= Ciosny, Zgierz County =

Ciosny
- Village
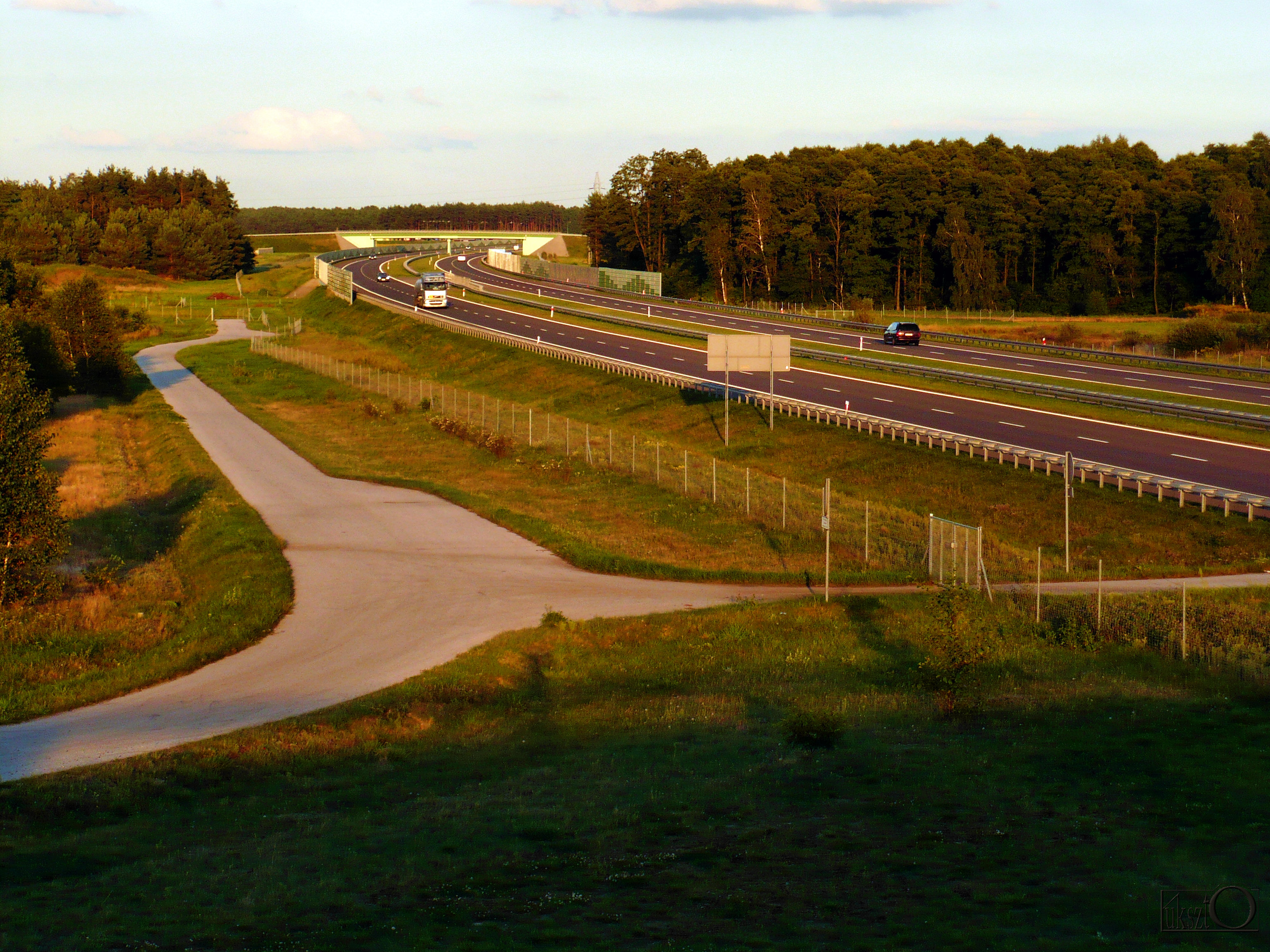

- Location within Poland
- Coordinates: 51°55′24″N 19°24′16″E
- Country: Poland
- Voivodeship: Łódź
- County: Zgierz
- Gmina: Zgierz

Ciosny [ˈt͡ɕɔsnɨ] is a village in the administrative district of Gmina Zgierz, within Zgierz County, Łódź Voivodeship, in central Poland.
