= Czaplinek (disambiguation) =

Czaplinek may refer to the following places:

- Czaplinek, Łódź Voivodeship (central Poland)
- Czaplinek, Masovian Voivodeship (east-central Poland)
- Czaplinek in West Pomeranian Voivodeship (north-west Poland)
