= Wypychów, Zgierz County =

Wypychów
- Village
- Location within Poland
- Coordinates: 51°59′N 19°25′E
- Country: Poland
- Voivodeship: Łódź
- County: Zgierz
- Gmina: Zgierz
- Population: 140

Wypychów [vɨˈpɨxuf] is a village in the administrative district of Gmina Zgierz, within Zgierz County, Łódź Voivodeship, in central Poland.
