= Podole =

Podole may refer to:

- Podolia, a region in Ukraine
- Podole, Aleksandrów County in Kuyavian-Pomeranian Voivodeship (north-central Poland)
- Podole, Lipno County in Kuyavian-Pomeranian Voivodeship (north-central Poland)
- Podole, Rypin County in Kuyavian-Pomeranian Voivodeship (north-central Poland)
- Podole, Lublin Voivodeship (east Poland)
- Podole, Łódź Voivodeship (central Poland)
- Podole, Lesser Poland Voivodeship (south Poland)
- Podole, Subcarpathian Voivodeship (south-east Poland)
- Podole, Świętokrzyskie Voivodeship (south-central Poland)
- Podole, Masovian Voivodeship (east-central Poland)
