= Moszczenica, Zgierz County =

Moszczenica
- Village
- Location within Poland
- Coordinates: 51°55′9″N 19°31′16″E
- Country: Poland
- Voivodeship: Łódź
- County: Zgierz
- Gmina: Zgierz
- Population: 20

Moszczenica [mɔʂt͡ʂɛˈnit͡sa] is a village in the administrative district of Gmina Zgierz, within Zgierz County, Łódź Voivodeship, in central Poland.
