= Siedlisko, Łódź Voivodeship =

Siedlisko
- Village
- Location within Poland
- Coordinates: 51°53′18″N 19°27′57″E
- Country: Poland
- Voivodeship: Łódź
- County: Zgierz
- Gmina: Zgierz
- Population: 50

Siedlisko [ɕɛdˈliskɔ] is a village in the administrative district of Gmina Zgierz, within Zgierz County, Łódź Voivodeship, in central Poland.
