= Podole, Łódź Voivodeship =

Podole
- Village
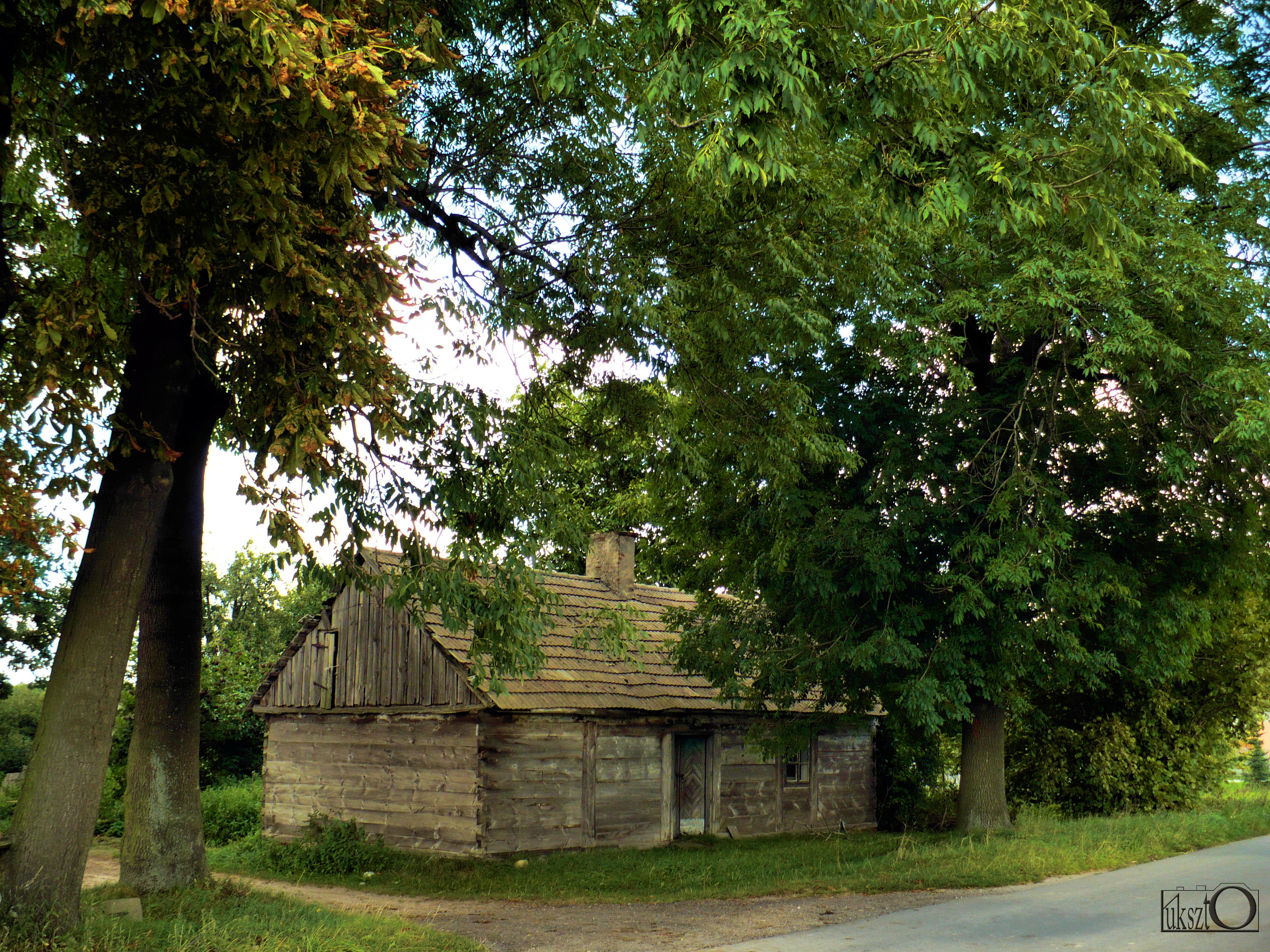

- Location within Poland
- Coordinates: 51°53′28″N 19°29′54″E
- Country: Poland
- Voivodeship: Łódź
- County: Zgierz
- Gmina: Zgierz

Podole [pɔˈdɔlɛ] is a village in the administrative district of Gmina Zgierz, within Zgierz County, Łódź Voivodeship, in central Poland.
