= Jasionka, Łódź Voivodeship =

Jasionka
- Village
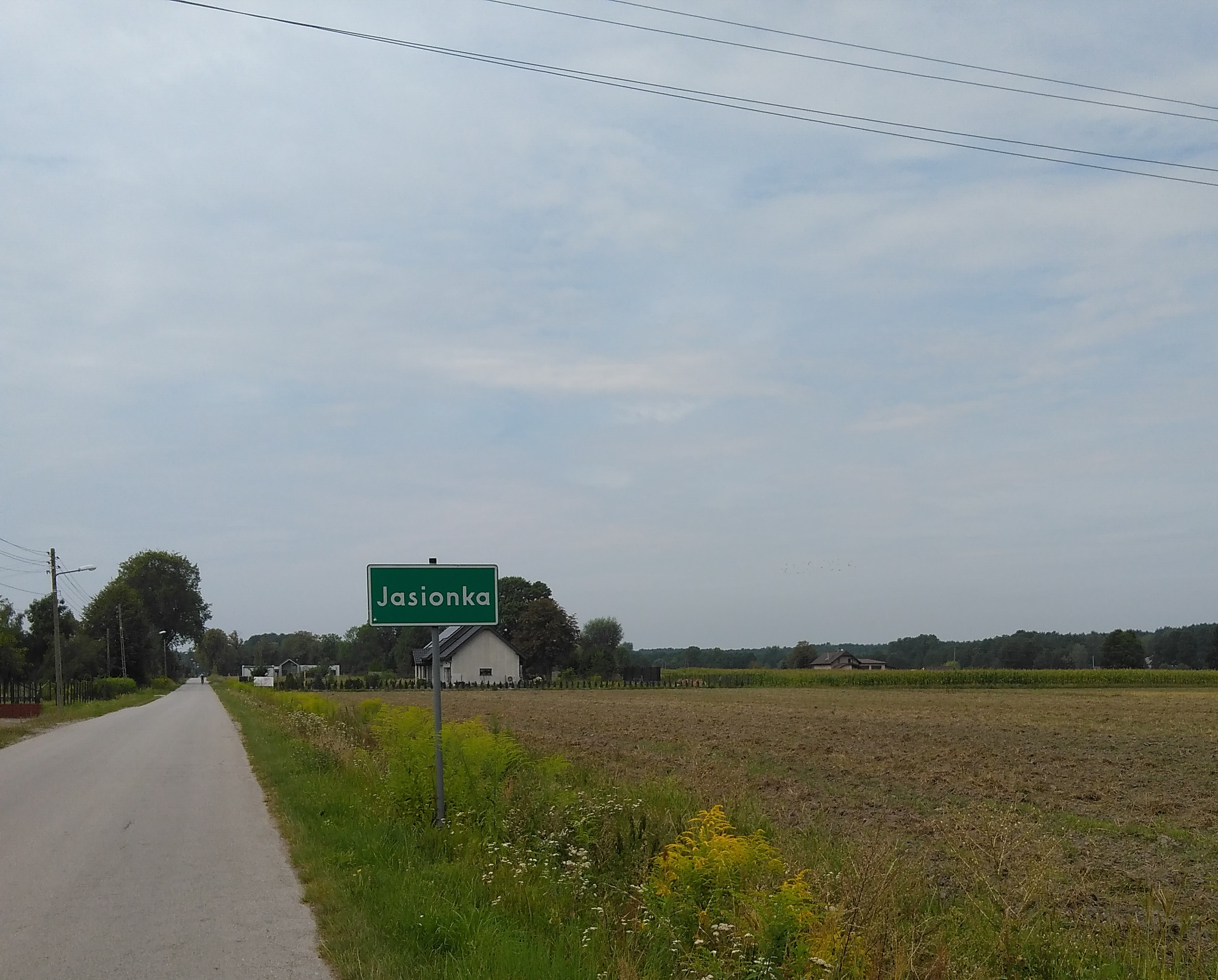

- Location within Poland
- Coordinates: 51°57′N 19°23′E
- Country: Poland
- Voivodeship: Łódź
- County: Zgierz
- Gmina: Zgierz

Jasionka [jaˈɕɔnka] is a village in the administrative district of Gmina Zgierz, within Zgierz County, Łódź Voivodeship, in central Poland.
