= Rosanów =

- Village
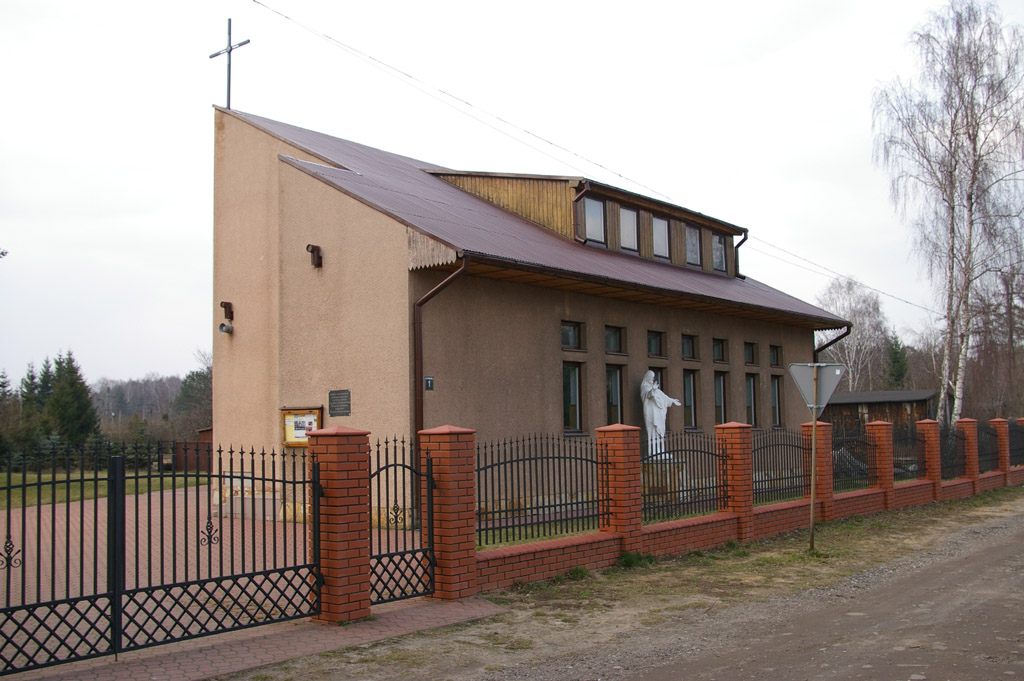

- Location within Poland
- Coordinates: 51°54′40″N 19°23′4″E
- Country: Poland
- Voivodeship: Łódź
- County: Zgierz
- Gmina: Zgierz

Rosanów [rɔˈsanuf] is a village in the administrative district of Gmina Zgierz, within Zgierz County, Łódź Voivodeship, in central Poland.
