= Gmina Zgierz =

Gmina Zgierz Zgierz Commune
- Gmina
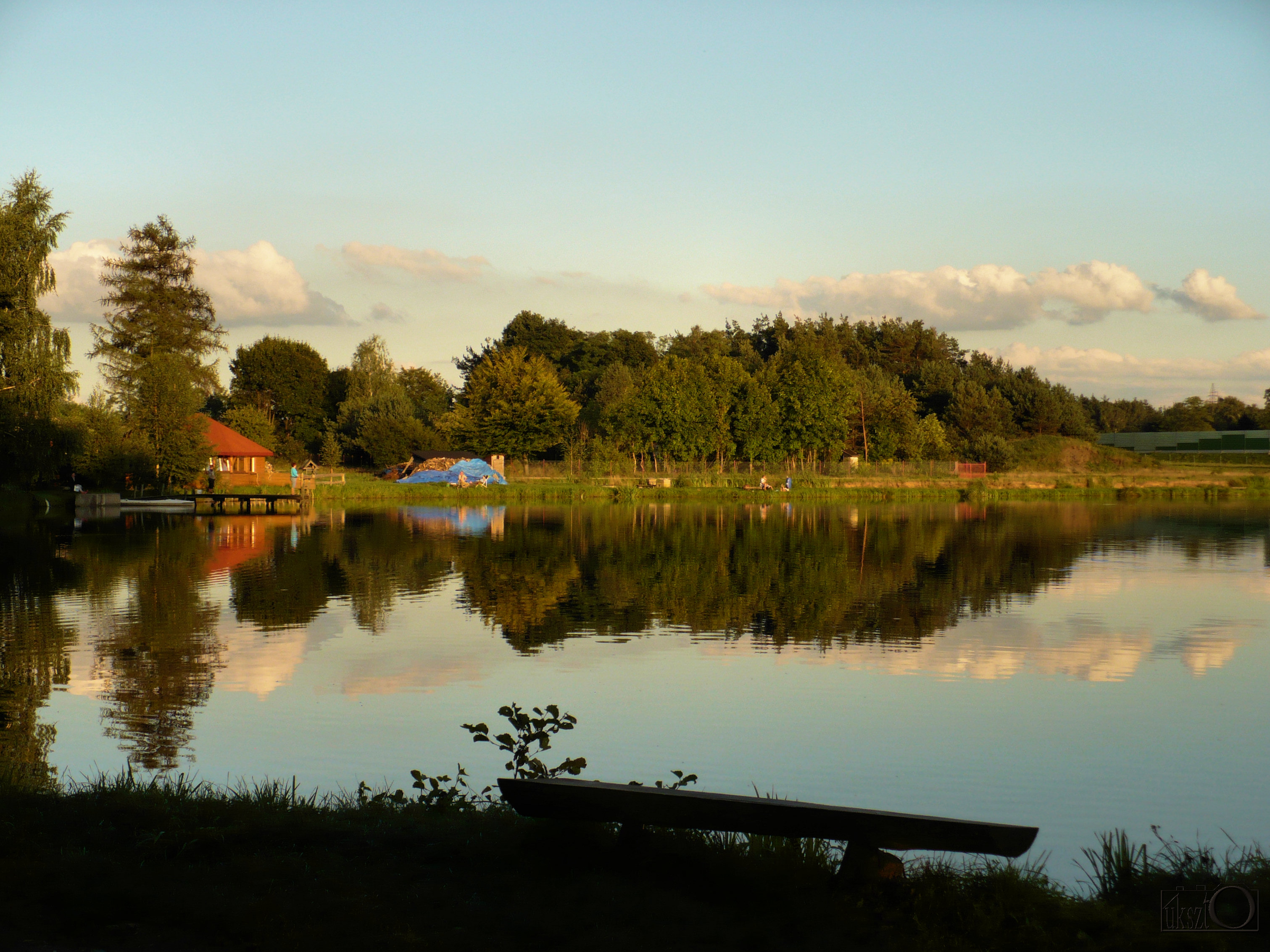

- Flag Coat of arms
- Interactive map of Gmina Zgierz
- Coordinates (Zgierz): 51°51′N 19°25′E
- Country: Poland
- Voivodeship: Łódź
- County: Zgierz
- Seat: Zgierz

Area
  - Total: 199.05 km^{2} (76.85 sq mi)

Population (2007)
  - Total: 11,766
  - Density: 59.111/km^{2} (153.10/sq mi)
- Website: www.gmina.zgierz.pl

Gmina Zgierz is a rural gmina (administrative district) in Zgierz County, Łódź Voivodeship, in central Poland. Its seat is the town of Zgierz, although the town is not part of the territory of the gmina.

The gmina covers an area of 199.05 square kilometres (76.9 sq mi), and as of 31.12.2007 its total population is 11,766.

The gmina contains part of the protected area called Łódź Hills Landscape Park.

== Villages ==
Gmina Zgierz contains the villages and settlements of:

- Adolfów
- Astachowice
- Bądków
- Besiekierz Nawojowy
- Besiekierz Rudny
- Biała
- Ciosny
- Ciosny-Kolonia
- Cyprianów
- Czaplinek
- Dąbrówka Wielka
- Dąbrówka-Malice
- Dąbrówka-Marianka
- Dąbrówka-Sowice
- Dąbrówka-Strumiany
- Dębniak
- Dzierżązna
- Emilia
- Florianów
- Gieczno
- Glinnik
- Głowa
- Grabiszew
- Grotniki
- Janów
- Jasionka
- Jedlicze A
- Jedlicze B
- Jeżewo
- Józefów
- Kania Góra
- Kębliny
- Kotowice
- Krzemień
- Kwilno
- Leonardów
- Leonów
- Lorenki
- Lućmierz
- Lućmierz-Las
- Maciejów
- Marcjanka
- Michałów
- Moszczenica
- Nowe Łagiewniki
- Osmolin
- Ostrów
- Palestyna
- Podole
- Rogóźno
- Rosanów
- Rozalinów
- Samotnik
- Siedlisko
- Skotniki
- Śladków Górny
- Słowik
- Smardzew
- Stare Brachowice
- Stare Łagiewniki
- Stefanów
- Swoboda
- Szczawin
- Szczawin Kościelny
- Szczawin Mały
- Szczawin-Kolonia
- Ukraina
- Ustronie
- Warszyce
- Wiktorów
- Władysławów
- Wola Branicka
- Wola Branicka-Kolonia
- Wola Rogozińska
- Wołyń
- Wypychów
- Zimna Woda

== Neighbouring gminas ==
Gmina Zgierz is bordered by the towns of Łódź and Ozorków, and by the gminas of Aleksandrów Łódzki, Głowno, Ozorków, Parzęczew, Piątek and Stryków.
