= Jeżewo, Łódź Voivodeship =

Jeżewo
- Village
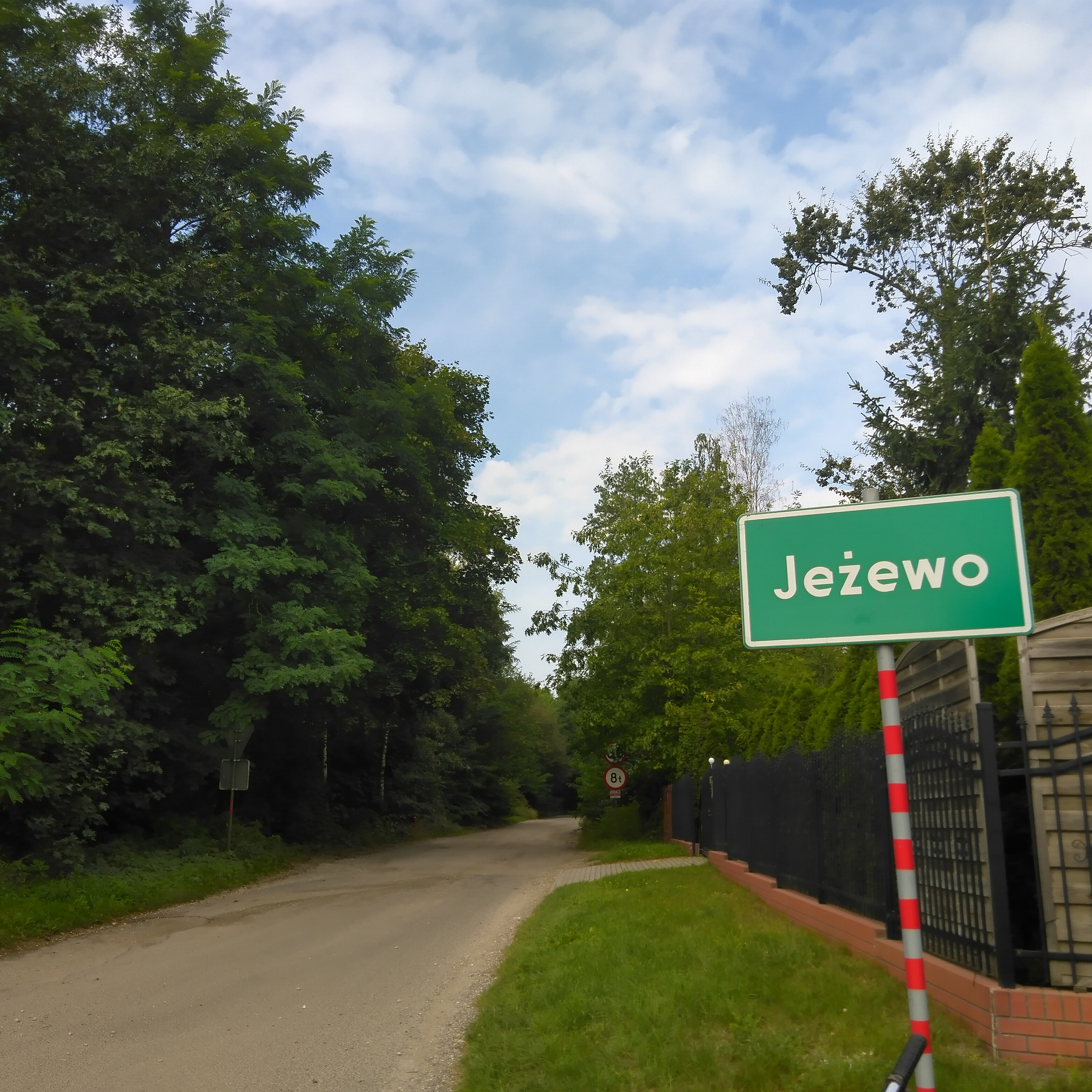

- Location within Poland
- Coordinates: 51°54′35″N 19°27′52″E
- Country: Poland
- Voivodeship: Łódź
- County: Zgierz
- Gmina: Zgierz
- Population: 50

Jeżewo [jɛˈʐɛvɔ] is a village in the administrative district of Gmina Zgierz, within Zgierz County, Łódź Voivodeship, in central Poland.
