= Dąbrówka Wielka, Łódź Voivodeship =

Dąbrówka Wielka
- Village
- Location within Poland
- Coordinates: 51°53′N 19°25′E
- Country: Poland
- Voivodeship: Łódź
- County: Zgierz
- Gmina: Zgierz

Dąbrówka Wielka [dɔmˈbrufka ˈvjɛlka] is a village in the administrative district of Gmina Zgierz, within Zgierz County, Łódź Voivodeship, in central Poland.
