= Ustronie, Łódź Voivodeship =

Ustronie
- Village
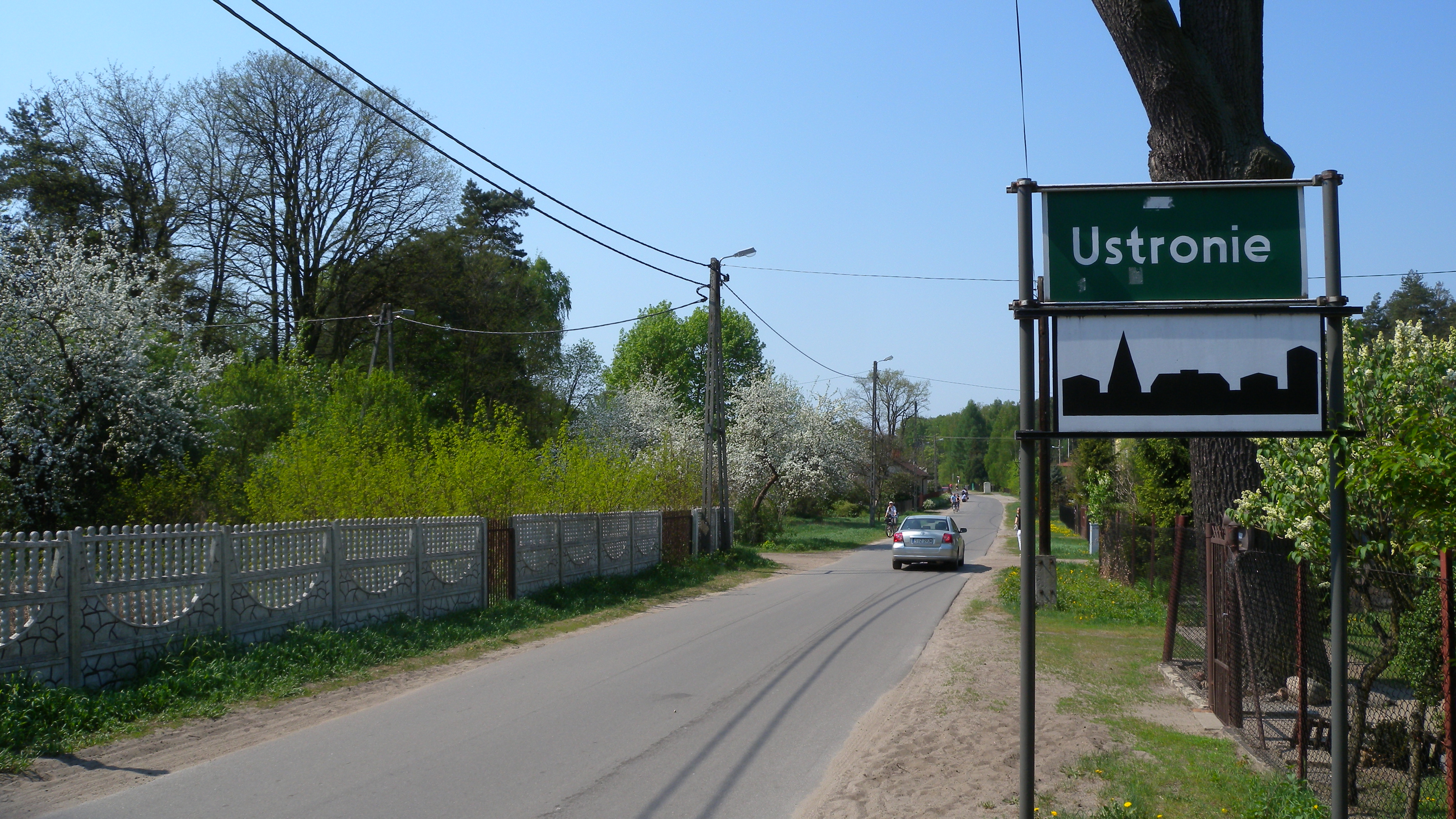

- Location within Poland
- Coordinates: 51°53′07″N 19°17′56″E
- Country: Poland
- Voivodeship: Łódź
- County: Zgierz
- Gmina: Zgierz
- Website: http://www.grotniki.info

Ustronie [usˈtrɔɲɛ] is a village in the administrative district of Gmina Zgierz, within Zgierz County, Łódź Voivodeship, in central Poland.
