= Marcjanka, Łódź Voivodeship =

Marcjanka
- Village
- Location within Poland
- Coordinates: 51°53′32″N 19°30′24″E
- Country: Poland
- Voivodeship: Łódź
- County: Zgierz
- Gmina: Zgierz

Marcjanka [mart͡sˈjaŋka] is a village in the administrative district of Gmina Zgierz, within Zgierz County, Łódź Voivodeship, in central Poland.
