= Wola Branicka =

- Village
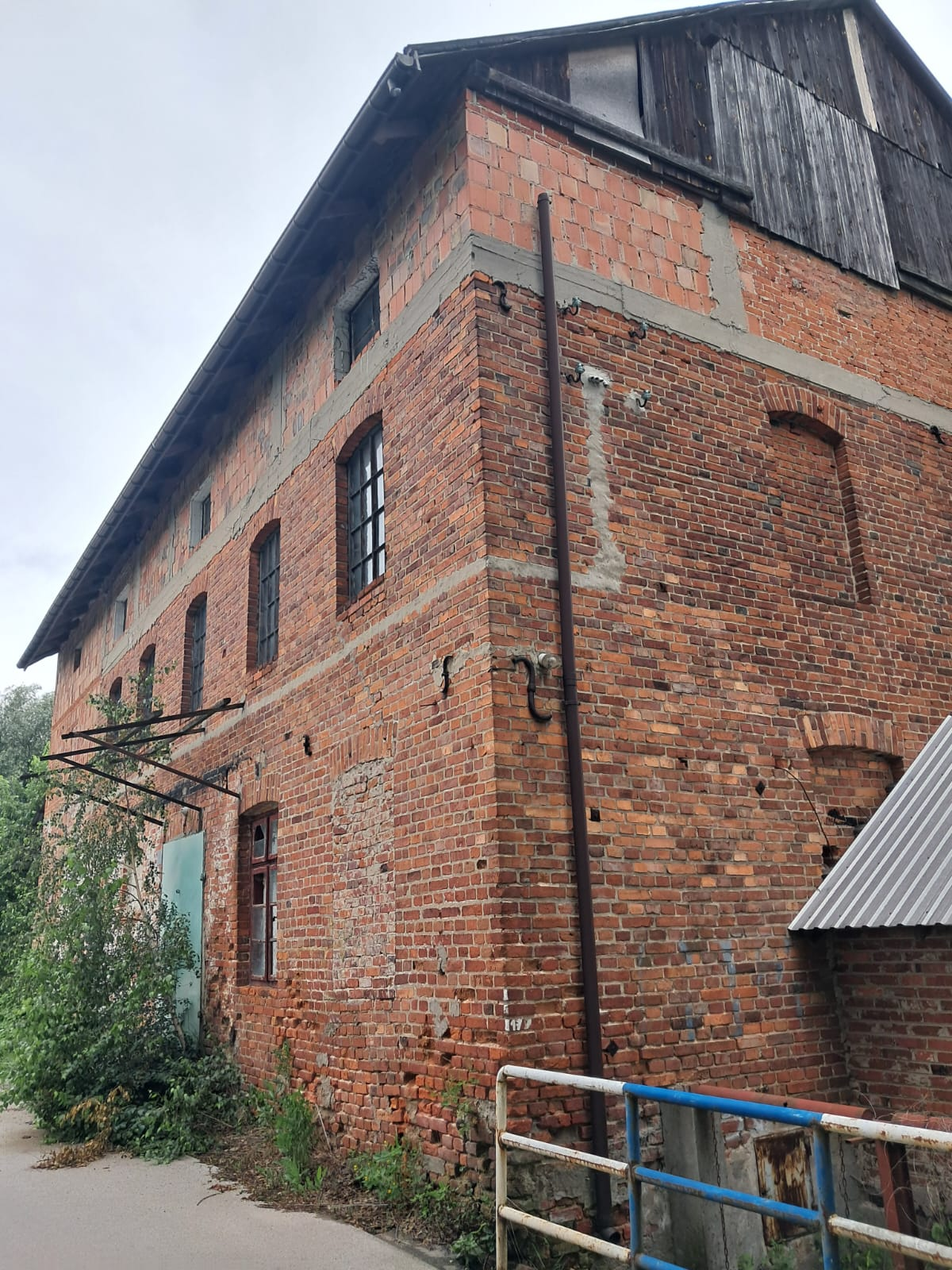

- Location within Poland
- Coordinates: 51°56′N 19°28′E
- Country: Poland
- Voivodeship: Łódź
- County: Zgierz
- Gmina: Zgierz

Wola Branicka ([ˈvɔla braˈnit͡ska]) is a village in the administrative district of Gmina Zgierz, within Zgierz County, Łódź Voivodeship, in central Poland.
