= Słowik, Łódź Voivodeship =

Słowik
- Village
- Location within Poland
- Coordinates: 51°55′N 19°21′E
- Country: Poland
- Voivodeship: Łódź
- County: Zgierz
- Gmina: Zgierz

Słowik [ˈswɔvik] is a village in the administrative district of Gmina Zgierz, within Zgierz County, Łódź Voivodeship, in central Poland.
