= Krzemień, Łódź Voivodeship =

Krzemień
- Village
- Location within Poland
- Coordinates: 51°53′54″N 19°18′16″E
- Country: Poland
- Voivodeship: Łódź
- County: Zgierz
- Gmina: Zgierz

Krzemień [ˈkʂɛmjɛɲ] is a village in the administrative district of Gmina Zgierz, within Zgierz County, Łódź Voivodeship, in central Poland.
