= Szczawin, Łódź Voivodeship =

Szczawin
- Village
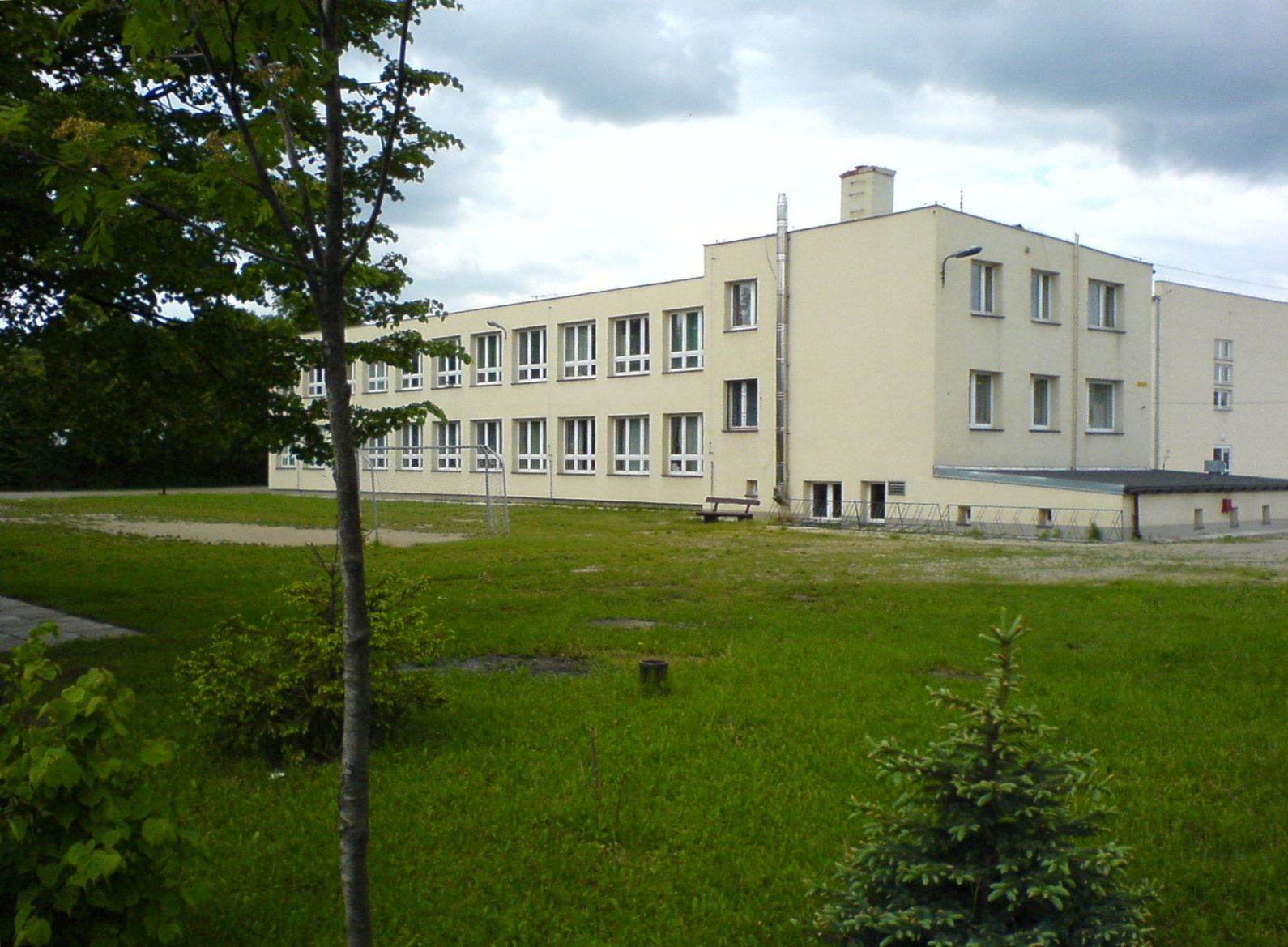

- Location within Poland
- Coordinates: 51°54′N 19°30′E
- Country: Poland
- Voivodeship: Łódź
- County: Zgierz
- Gmina: Zgierz

Szczawin [ˈʂt͡ʂavin] is a village in the administrative district of Gmina Zgierz, within Zgierz County, Łódź Voivodeship, in central Poland.
