= Czaplinek, Łódź Voivodeship =

Czaplinek
- Village
- Location within Poland
- Coordinates: 51°53′N 19°30′E
- Country: Poland
- Voivodeship: Łódź
- County: Zgierz
- Gmina: Zgierz

Czaplinek [t͡ʂaˈplinɛk] (1943–1945 German Lehmfeld) is a village in the administrative district of Gmina Zgierz, within Zgierz County, Łódź Voivodeship, in central Poland.
