= Bzura =

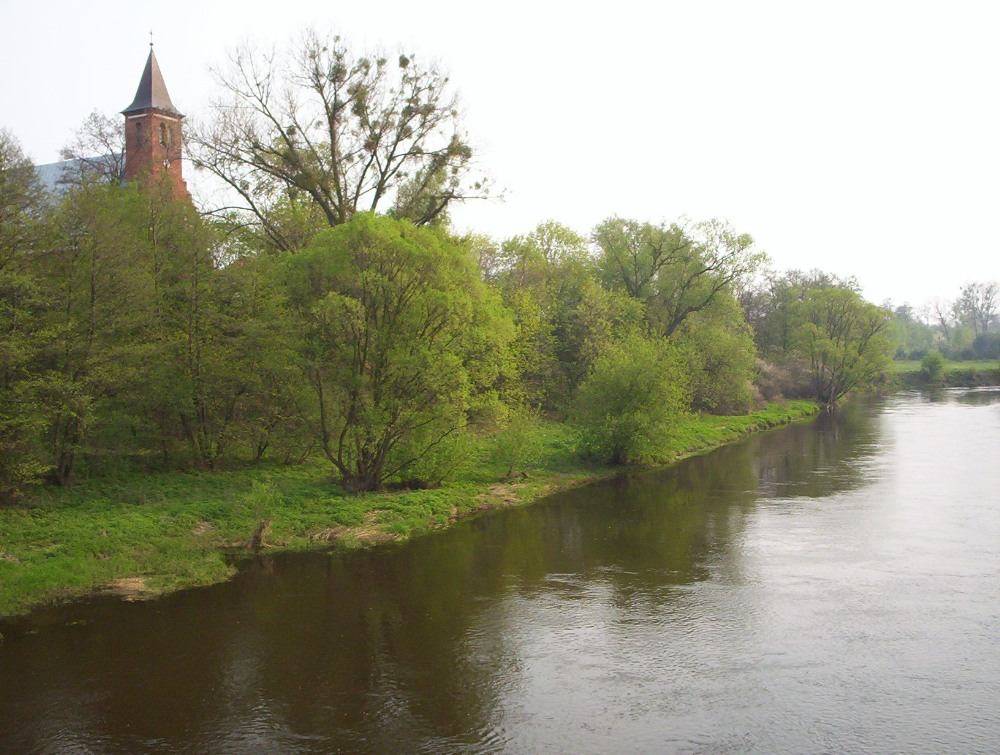
- The Bzura in Kozłów Biskupi Mouth of the Bzura on the map of Poland

Location
- Country: Poland

Physical characteristics
- Mouth
  - location: Vistula
  - coordinates: 52°22′28″N 20°12′05″E
- Length: 173 km (107 mi)
- Basin size: 7,764 km^{2} (2,998 sq mi)
- Discharge
  - average: 28.6 m^{3}/s (1,010 cu ft/s)

Basin features
- Progression: Vistula→ Baltic Sea

The Bzura is a river in central Poland. A tributary of the Vistula river (in Wyszogród), the Bzura is 173 kilometres long and has a basin area of 7,764 km^{2}. During the Second World War, Polish forces made a major stand here against the Wehrmacht in an attempt to halt the German advance on Warsaw (Battle of the Bzura).

== Towns and townships ==
- Zgierz
- Aleksandrów Łódzki
- Ozorków
- Łęczyca
- Łowicz
- Sochaczew
- Brochów
- Wyszogród

== Eastern tributaries ==
- Linda
- Moszczenica
- Mroga
- Struga
- Bobrówka
- Skierniewka
- Rawka
- Pisia
- Sucha
- Utrata
- Łasica

== Western tributaries ==
- Witonia
- Ochnia
- Słudwia

== See also ==
- Rivers of Poland
- Battle of the Bzura
