= Emilia, Łódź Voivodeship =

Emilia
- Village
- Location within Poland
- Coordinates: 51°55′27″N 19°21′42″E
- Country: Poland
- Voivodeship: Łódź
- County: Zgierz
- Gmina: Zgierz
- Population: 350

Emilia [ɛˈmilja] is a village in the administrative district of Gmina Zgierz, within Zgierz County, Łódź Voivodeship, in central Poland.
