= Orłów-Kolonia =

- Village
- Location within Poland
- Coordinates: 52°8′1″N 19°34′9″E
- Country: Poland
- Voivodeship: Łódź
- County: Kutno
- Gmina: Bedlno

Orłów-Kolonia [ˈɔrwuf kɔˈlɔɲa] is a village in the administrative district of Gmina Bedlno, within Kutno County, Łódź Voivodeship, in Central Poland.
