= Krzemień =

Mountain in Poland

Coordinates: 49°5′9″N 22°44′20″E

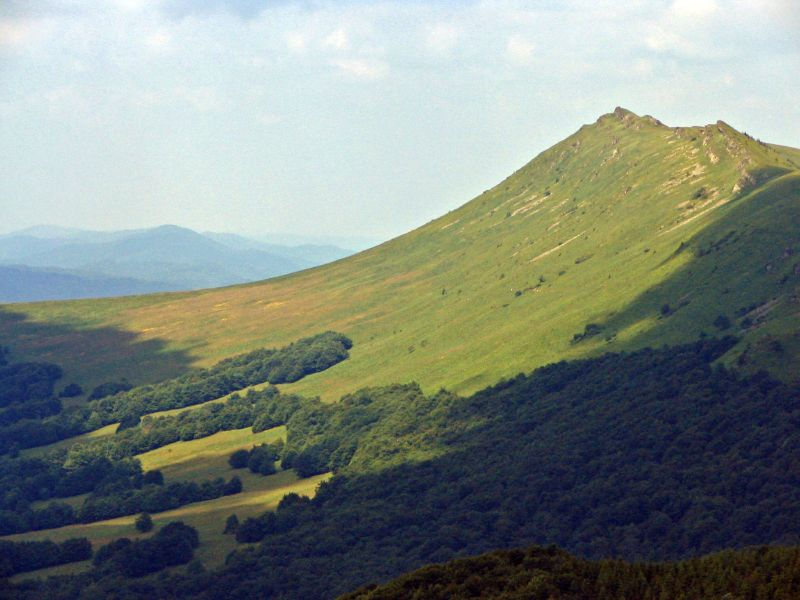
Krzemień mountain in Beskidy, Bieszczady Mountains, Southern Poland

Krzemień is a mountain in the Bieszczady Mountains of southern Poland. It has an elevation of 1,335 meters.
