= Szynkielew =

- Village
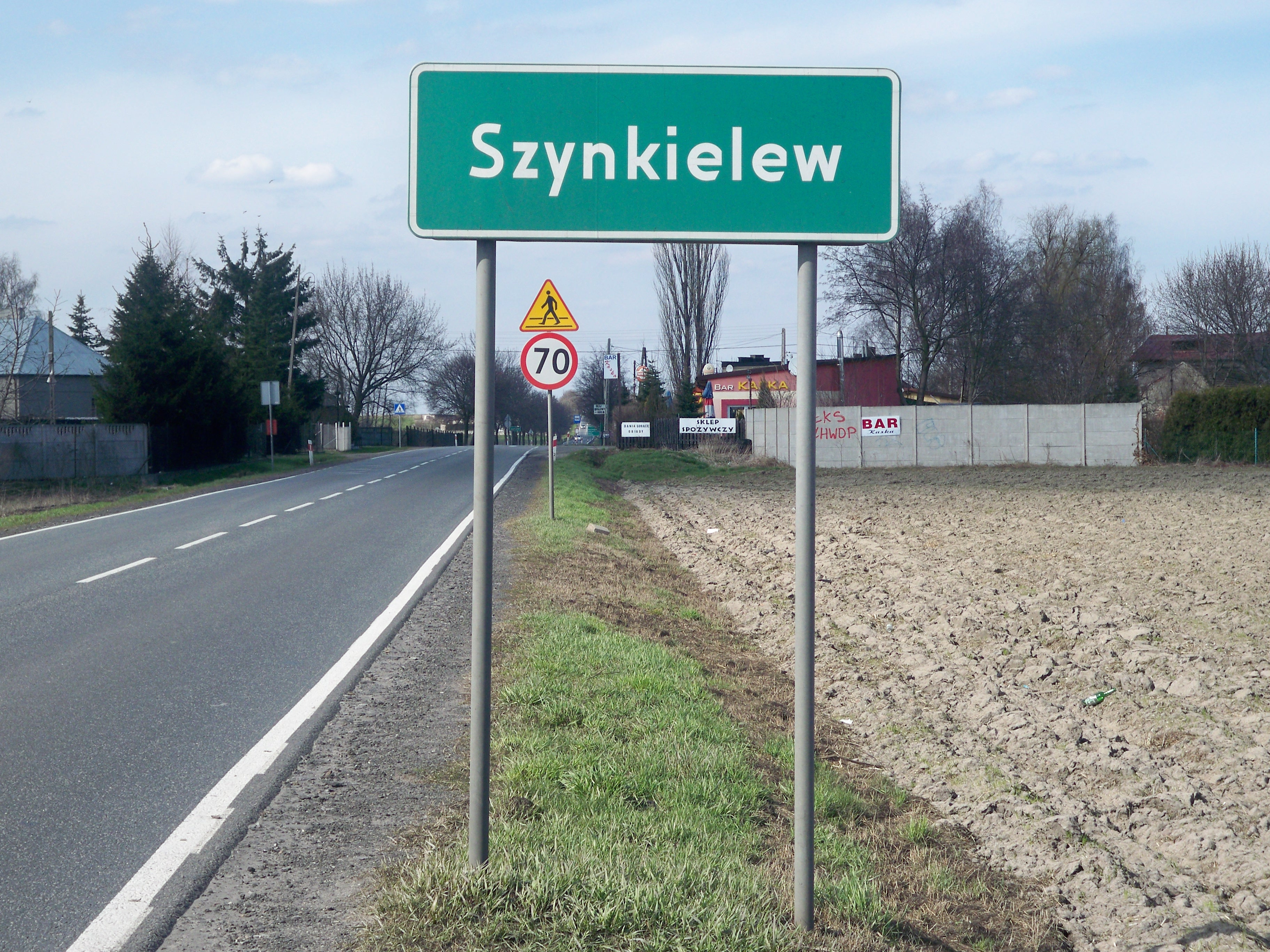
- Entrance sign

- Location within Poland
- Coordinates: 51°41′5″N 19°19′26″E
- Country: Poland
- Voivodeship: Łódź
- County: Pabianice
- Gmina: Pabianice
- Population: 330

Szynkielew [ʂɨŋˈkʲɛlɛf] is a village in the administrative district of Gmina Pabianice, within Pabianice County, Łódź Voivodeship, in central Poland.
