= Lućmierz, Zgierz County =

Lućmierz
- Settlement
- Location within Poland
- Coordinates: 51°54′10″N 19°23′38″E
- Country: Poland
- Voivodeship: Łódź
- County: Zgierz
- Gmina: Zgierz

Lućmierz [ˈlut͡ɕmjɛʂ] is a settlement in the administrative district of Gmina Zgierz, within Zgierz County, Łódź Voivodeship, in central Poland.
