= Zgierz County =

Zgierz County Powiat zgierski
- County
- Flag Coat of arms

- Location within the voivodeship
- Coordinates (Zgierz): 51°51′N 19°25′E
- Country: Poland
- Voivodeship: Łódź
- Seat: Zgierz
- Gminas: Total 9 (incl. 3 urban): Głowno; Ozorków; Zgierz; Gmina Aleksandrów Łódzki; Gmina Głowno; Gmina Ozorków; Gmina Parzęczew; Gmina Stryków; Gmina Zgierz

Area
  - Total: 853.71 km^{2} (329.62 sq mi)

Population (31.12.2016)
  - Total: 165,206
  - Density: 193.52/km^{2} (501.20/sq mi)
  - Urban: 116,129
  - Rural: 49,077
- Car plates: EZG
- Website: www.powiat.zgierz.pl

Zgierz County (Polish: powiat zgierski) is a unit of territorial administration and local government (powiat) in Łódź Voivodeship, central Poland. It came into being on January 1, 1999, as a result of the Polish local government reforms in 1998. Its administrative seat and largest town is Zgierz, which lies 9 kilometres (6 mi) north-west of the regional capital Łódź. The county contains four other towns: Ozorków, lying 16 km (10 mi) north-west of Zgierz, Aleksandrów Łódzki, lying 9 km (6 mi) south-west of Zgierz, Głowno, 24 km (15 mi) north-east of Zgierz, and Stryków, 15 km (9 mi) north-east of Zgierz.

The county covers an area of 853.71 square kilometres (329.6 sq mi). As of 2016, its total population is 165,206, out of which the population of Zgierz is 56,929, that of Ozorków is 19,809, that of Aleksandrów Łódzki is 21,380, that of Głowno is 14,534, that of Stryków is 3,477, and the rural population is 49,077.

== Neighbouring counties ==
Zgierz County is bordered by Łowicz County to the north-east, Brzeziny County to the east, the city of Łódź, Łódź East County and Pabianice County to the south, Poddębice County to the west, and Łęczyca County to the north-west.

== Administrative divisions ==
The county is subdivided into nine gminas (three urban, two urban-rural and four rural). These are listed in the following table, in descending order of population.

Gmina	Type	Area (km^{2})	Population (2016)	Seat
Zgierz	urban	42.3	56,929	
Gmina Aleksandrów Łódzki	urban-rural	115.6	30,980	Aleksandrów Łódzki
Ozorków	urban	15.5	19,809	
Głowno	urban	19.8	14,534	
Gmina Zgierz	rural	199.2	13,743	Zgierz *
Gmina Stryków	urban-rural	157.8	12,418	Stryków
Gmina Ozorków	rural	95.2	6,942	Ozorków *
Gmina Parzęczew	rural	103.8	5,012	Parzęczew
Gmina Głowno	rural	104.5	4,839	Głowno *
* seat not part of the gmina
