= Orla =

Orla may refer to:

== Places ==
- Orla, Missouri, USA
- Orla, Texas, USA
- Orla, Jharkhand, India
- Orla, Podlaskie Voivodeship (north-east Poland), a village
  - Gmina Orla, a commune centred on the village
- Orla, Krotoszyn County in Greater Poland Voivodeship (west-central Poland)
- Orla, Wągrowiec County in Greater Poland Voivodeship (west-central Poland)
- Orła, Łódź Voivodeship (central Poland)

== Rivers ==
- Orla (Barycz), a river in Poland, tributary of the Barycz
- Orla (Saale), a river in Thuringia, Germany, tributary of the Saale
- Orla (Kleine Röder), a river in Saxony, Germany, tributary of the Kleine Röder

== Other uses ==
- Orla (name), a female given name of Irish origin and also a male given name of Danish origin
- Tropical Storm Orla (disambiguation)
- Orla coat of arms Polish Szlachta coat of arms
- LÉ Orla (P41), a ship of the Irish navy
- Orla.fm, the only bi-lingual radio station for Polish and English-speaking audiences in the United Kingdom and Ireland
- Orla Railway in southern Germany
- Orla (dog), an English Cocker Spaniel owned by William, Prince of Wales, and Catherine, Princess of Wales
