= Duraj (disambiguation) =

Duraj is a village in Afghanistan.

Duraj may also refer to:

- Anna Gębala-Duraj, Polish cross-country skier
- Duraj, Poland
- Taras Duraj or Taras Duray, Ukrainian professional football player
