= Śliwniki =

Śliwniki may refer to the following places:

- Śliwniki, Greater Poland Voivodeship (west-central Poland)
- Śliwniki, Gmina Ozorków in Łódź Voivodeship (central Poland)
- Śliwniki, Gmina Parzęczew in Łódź Voivodeship (central Poland)
