= Różyce =

Różyce may refer to:

- Różyce, Łowicz County
- Różyce, Zgierz County
- Różyce Żmijowe
- Różyce-Żurawieniec
