= Solca (disambiguation) =

Solca is a town in Romania

Solca may also refer to:

== Places ==
=== Czech Republic ===
- Solca (Karviná), an abandoned village

=== Poland ===
- Sólca, a village in Subcarpathian Voivodeship
- Solca, Poland, a village in Silesian Voivodeship
- Solca Mała, a village
- Solca Wielka, a village

=== Romania ===
- Solca, a village in Oniceni Commune, Romania
- Poieni-Solca, a commune in Romania
- Solca (river), a river in Romania

== Organizations ==
- Sociedad de Lucha Contra el Cancer

== See also ==
- Solec
- Solčava
- Scolca
