= Barbara Brylska =

Polish actress (born 1941)

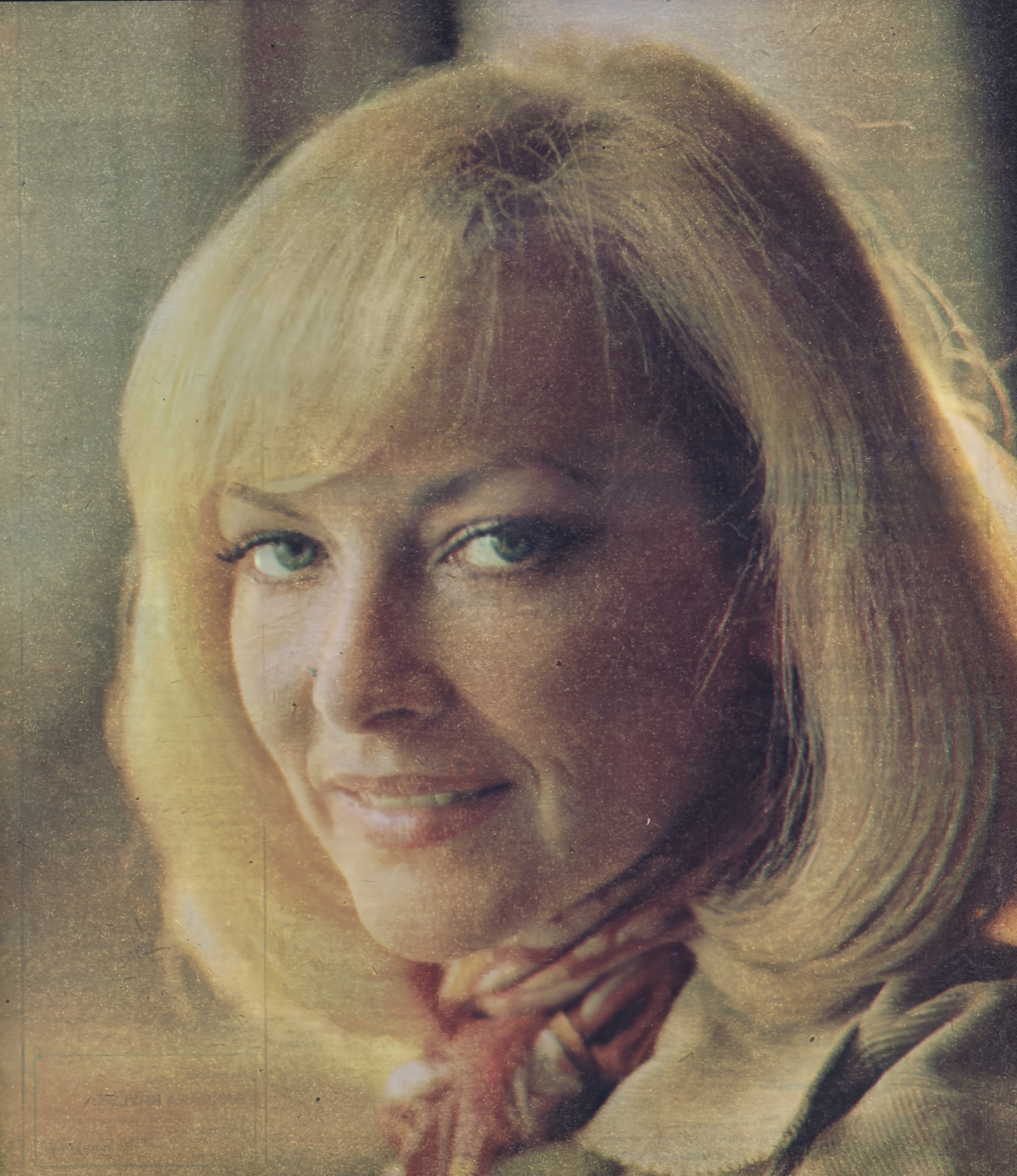
- Brylska in 1978
- Born: 5 June 1941 (age 85); Skotniki, General Government (present-day Poland)
- Education: National Film School in Łódź (MFA)
- Occupation: Actress
- Years active: 1956–2025

Signature
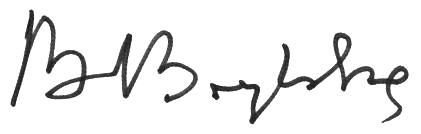

Barbara Brylska (born 5 June 1941) is a Polish actress who gained critical acclaim in the 1960s and was featured in numerous films throughout the countries of the Warsaw Pact including the Soviet Union. She is noted especially for her role as Nadya in the 1976 Soviet comedy film Irony of Fate.

== Life and career ==
Barbara Brylska was born on 29 May 1941, in Skotniki. At age 15, she was cast in the film Kalosze szczęścia. After this role, she took acting lessons in a theater school and became a student at the National Film School in Łódź, where in 1967 she completed her acting education at the Faculty of Acting.

Brylska's first major role was in the film Ich dzień powszedni (1963). In 1966, she played the Phoenician priestess Kama in the feature film Pharaoh (Polish: Faraon), based on the novel by Bolesław Prus.

Apart from Polish-directed movies, she has also played in films directed by Soviet, Czechoslovak and Bulgarian directors.

For her role as Nadya in the 1975 film Irony of Fate, directed by Eldar Ryazanov, she received a Soviet state award. She became a popular actress in the Soviet Union. She would later claim that her success caused jealousy in the Polish film community and led it to ignore her work.

In 1977, she was a member of the jury at the 10th Moscow International Film Festival.

From 2000, Brylska acted in stage plays, primarily in Russia. She reprised the role of the aged Nadya in the 2007 Irony of Fate: The Sequel.

== Awards ==
1. State award of the Soviet Union — 1977: Irony of Fate
