= Skórka =

Skórka may refer to the following villages in Poland:

- Skórka, Łódź Voivodeship (central Poland)
- Skórka, Greater Poland Voivodeship (west-central Poland)
