= Zelgoszcz =

Zelgoszcz may refer to the following places:

- Zelgoszcz, Poddębice County in Łódź Voivodeship (central Poland)
- Zelgoszcz, Gmina Parzęczew in Łódź Voivodeship (central Poland)
- Zelgoszcz, Gmina Stryków in Łódź Voivodeship (central Poland)
- Zelgoszcz, Pomeranian Voivodeship (north Poland)
