= Parzyce =

Parzyce may refer to the following places in Poland:

- Parzyce, Lower Silesian Voivodeship (south-west Poland)
- Parzyce, Łódź Voivodeship (central Poland)
