= Piaskowiec =

Piaskowiec may refer to:

- Piaskowiec, Pomeranian Voivodeship, a village in the administrative district of Gmina Ostaszewo, Poland
- Piaskowiec, Warmian-Masurian Voivodeship, a village in the administrative district of Gmina Korsze, Poland

== See also ==
- Piaskowice
