= Nowa Jerozolima =

Nowa Jerozolima ("New Jerusalem" in Polish) can mean:

- Nowa Jerozolima, Łódź Voivodeship, a village in the administrative district of Gmina Parzęczew, Zgierz County, Łódź Voivodeship
- Nowa Jerozolima, a historical Jewish community in Bożydar-Kałęczyn, in what is now Warsaw
