= Anastazew, Łódź Voivodeship =

Anastazew
- Village
- Location within Poland
- Coordinates: 51°53′14″N 19°11′28″E
- Country: Poland
- Voivodeship: Łódź
- County: Zgierz
- Gmina: Parzęczew

Anastazew [anasˈtazɛf] is a village in the administrative district of Gmina Parzęczew, within Zgierz County, Łódź Voivodeship, in central Poland.
