= Wielka Wieś, Zgierz County =

Wielka Wieś
- Village
- Location within Poland
- Coordinates: 51°57′53″N 19°12′40″E
- Country: Poland
- Voivodeship: Łódź
- County: Zgierz
- Gmina: Parzęczew

Wielka Wieś [ˈvjɛlka ˈvjɛɕ] is a village in the administrative district of Gmina Parzęczew, within Zgierz County, Łódź Voivodeship, in central Poland.
