= Kozikówka =

- Settlement
- Location within Poland
- Coordinates: 51°58′52″N 19°08′11″E
- Country: Poland
- Voivodeship: Łódź
- County: Zgierz
- Gmina: Parzęczew

Kozikówka [kɔʑiˈkufka] is a settlement in the administrative district of Gmina Parzęczew, within Zgierz County, Łódź Voivodeship, in central Poland.
