= Chociszew, Zgierz County =

Chociszew
- Village
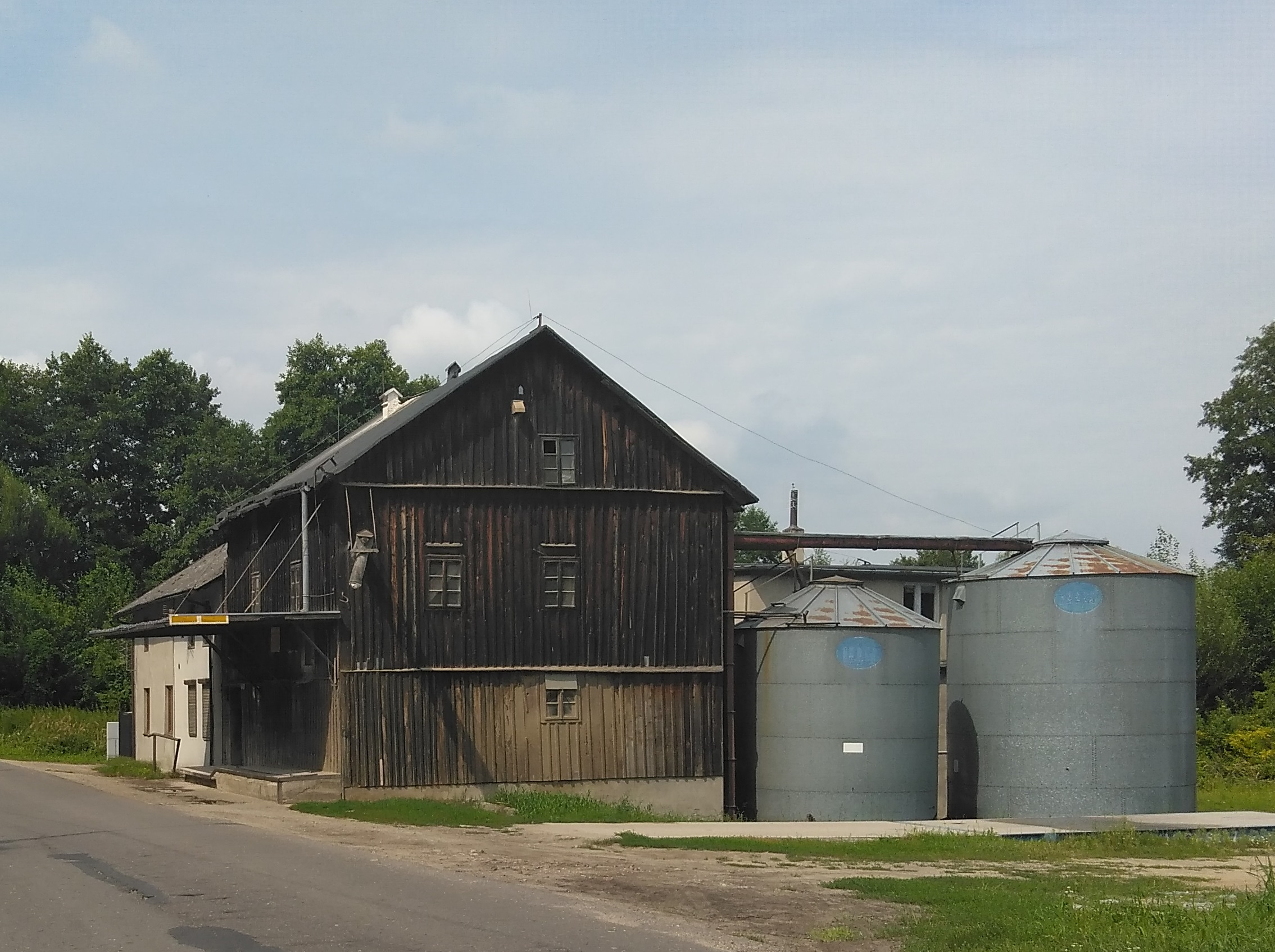

- Location within Poland
- Coordinates: 51°55′34″N 19°14′43″E
- Country: Poland
- Voivodeship: Łódź
- County: Zgierz
- Gmina: Parzęczew

Chociszew [xɔˈt͡ɕiʂɛf] is a village in the administrative district of Gmina Parzęczew, within Zgierz County, Łódź Voivodeship, in central Poland.
