= Trojany, Łódź Voivodeship =

Trojany
- Village
- Location within Poland
- Coordinates: 51°58′54″N 19°10′27″E
- Country: Poland
- Voivodeship: Łódź
- County: Zgierz
- Gmina: Parzęczew

Trojany [trɔˈjanɨ] is a village in the administrative district of Gmina Parzęczew, within Zgierz County, Łódź Voivodeship, in central Poland.
