= Ignacew Parzęczewski =

- Village
- Location within Poland
- Coordinates: 51°55′44″N 19°11′6″E
- Country: Poland
- Voivodeship: Łódź
- County: Zgierz
- Gmina: Parzęczew
- Population: 40

Ignacew Parzęczewski [iɡˈnat͡sɛf paʐɛnˈt͡ʂɛfski] is a village in the administrative district of Gmina Parzęczew, within Zgierz County, Łódź Voivodeship, in central Poland.
