= Mrożewice =

- Village
- Location within Poland
- Coordinates: 51°58′29″N 19°12′9″E
- Country: Poland
- Voivodeship: Łódź
- County: Zgierz
- Gmina: Parzęczew

Mrożewice [mrɔʐɛˈvit͡sɛ] is a village in the administrative district of Gmina Parzęczew, within Zgierz County, Łódź Voivodeship, in central Poland.
