= Opole, Łódź Voivodeship =

Opole
- Village
- Location within Poland
- Coordinates: 51°59′40″N 19°10′21″E
- Country: Poland
- Voivodeship: Łódź
- County: Zgierz
- Gmina: Parzęczew

Opole [ɔˈpɔlɛ] is a village in the administrative district of Gmina Parzęczew, within Zgierz County, Łódź Voivodeship, in central Poland.
