= Mamień =

- Settlement
- Location within Poland
- Coordinates: 51°56′14″N 19°15′52″E
- Country: Poland
- Voivodeship: Łódź
- County: Zgierz
- Gmina: Parzęczew

Mamień [ˈmamjɛɲ] is a settlement in the administrative district of Gmina Parzęczew, within Zgierz County, Łódź Voivodeship, in central Poland.
