= Mikołajew, Zgierz County =

Mikołajew
- Village
- Location within Poland
- Coordinates: 51°55′32″N 19°14′5″E
- Country: Poland
- Voivodeship: Łódź
- County: Zgierz
- Gmina: Parzęczew

Mikołajew [mikɔˈwajɛf] is a village in the administrative district of Gmina Parzęczew, within Zgierz County, Łódź Voivodeship, in central Poland.
