= Katarzynów, Zgierz County =

Katarzynów
- Village
- Location within Poland
- Coordinates: 51°57′21″N 19°23′44″E
- Country: Poland
- Voivodeship: Łódź
- County: Zgierz
- Gmina: Ozorków
- Population: 40

Katarzynów [kataˈʐɨnuf] is a village in the administrative district of Gmina Ozorków, within Zgierz County, Łódź Voivodeship, in central Poland.
