= Boczki, Zgierz County =

Boczki
- Village
- Location within Poland
- Coordinates: 52°1′2″N 19°19′0″E
- Country: Poland
- Voivodeship: Łódź
- County: Zgierz
- Gmina: Ozorków
- Population: 120

Boczki [ˈbɔt͡ʂki] is a village in the administrative district of Gmina Ozorków, within Zgierz County, Łódź Voivodeship, in central Poland.
