= Tkaczew =

- Village
- Location within Poland
- Coordinates: 52°0′23″N 19°11′48″E
- Country: Poland
- Voivodeship: Łódź
- County: Zgierz
- Gmina: Ozorków
- Population: 10

Tkaczew [ˈtkat͡ʂɛf] is a village in the administrative district of Gmina Ozorków, within Zgierz County, Łódź Voivodeship, in central Poland.
