= Śniatowa =

- Village
- Location within Poland
- Coordinates: 51°57′N 19°9′E
- Country: Poland
- Voivodeship: Łódź
- County: Zgierz
- Gmina: Parzęczew

Śniatowa [ɕɲaˈtɔva] is a village in the administrative district of Gmina Parzęczew, within Zgierz County, Łódź Voivodeship, in central Poland.
