= Sulimy, Łódź Voivodeship =

Sulimy
- Settlement
- Location within Poland
- Coordinates: 51°58′25″N 19°10′36″E
- Country: Poland
- Voivodeship: Łódź
- County: Zgierz
- Gmina: Parzęczew

Sulimy [suˈlimɨ] is a settlement in the administrative district of Gmina Parzęczew, within Zgierz County, Łódź Voivodeship, in central Poland.
