= Sokolniki, Zgierz County =

Sokolniki
- Village
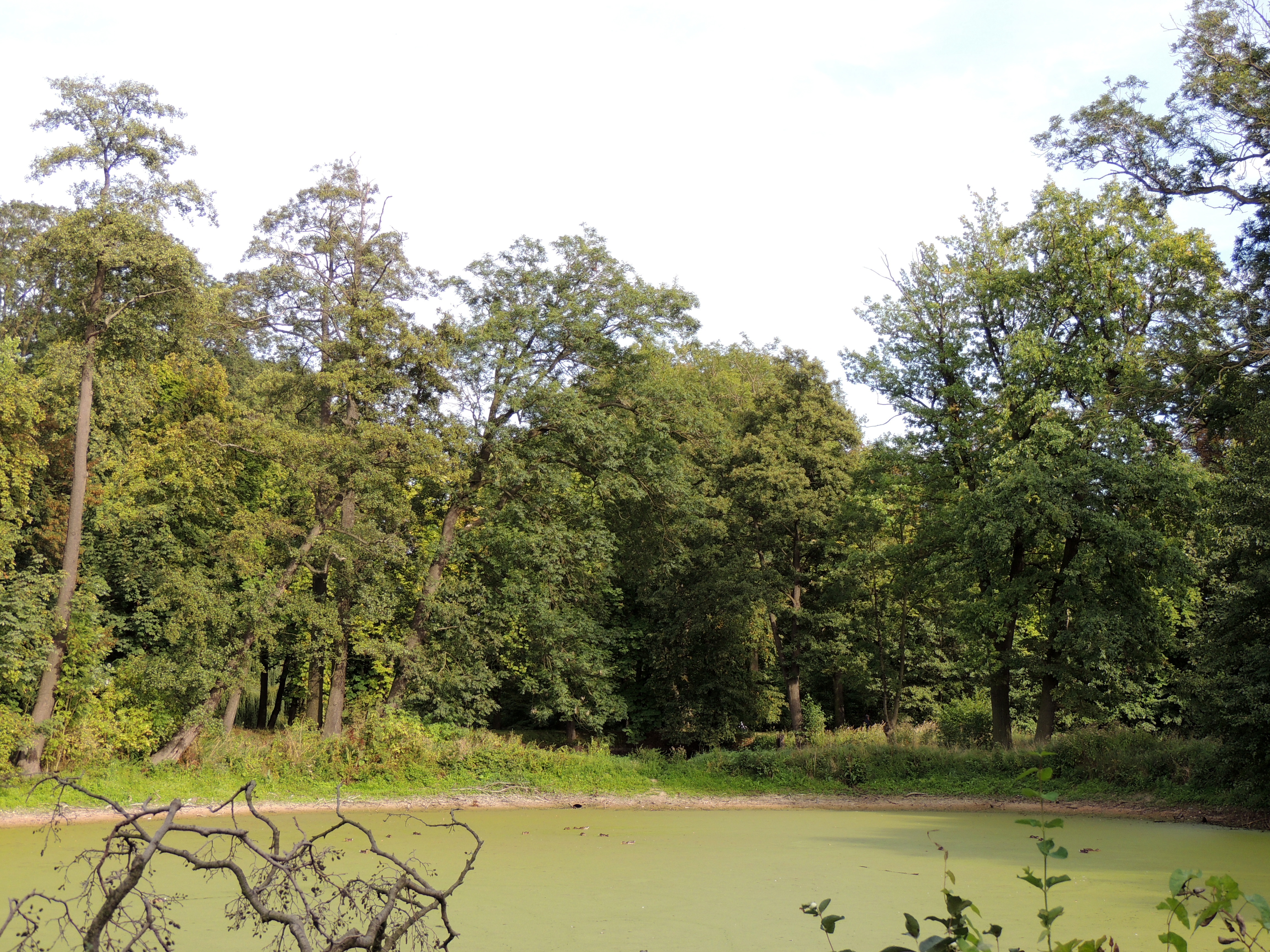
- Park

- Location within Poland
- Coordinates: 51°58′1″N 19°21′58″E
- Country: Poland
- Voivodeship: Łódź
- County: Zgierz
- Gmina: Ozorków

Sokolniki [sɔkɔlˈɲikʲi] is a village in the administrative district of Gmina Ozorków, within Zgierz County, Łódź Voivodeship, in central Poland.
