= Małachowice-Kolonia =

- Village
- Location within Poland
- Coordinates: 52°0′4″N 19°21′26″E
- Country: Poland
- Voivodeship: Łódź
- County: Zgierz
- Gmina: Ozorków

Małachowice-Kolonia [mawaxɔˈvit͡sɛ kɔˈlɔɲa] is a village in the administrative district of Gmina Ozorków, within Zgierz County, Łódź Voivodeship, in central Poland.
