= Modlna =

- Village
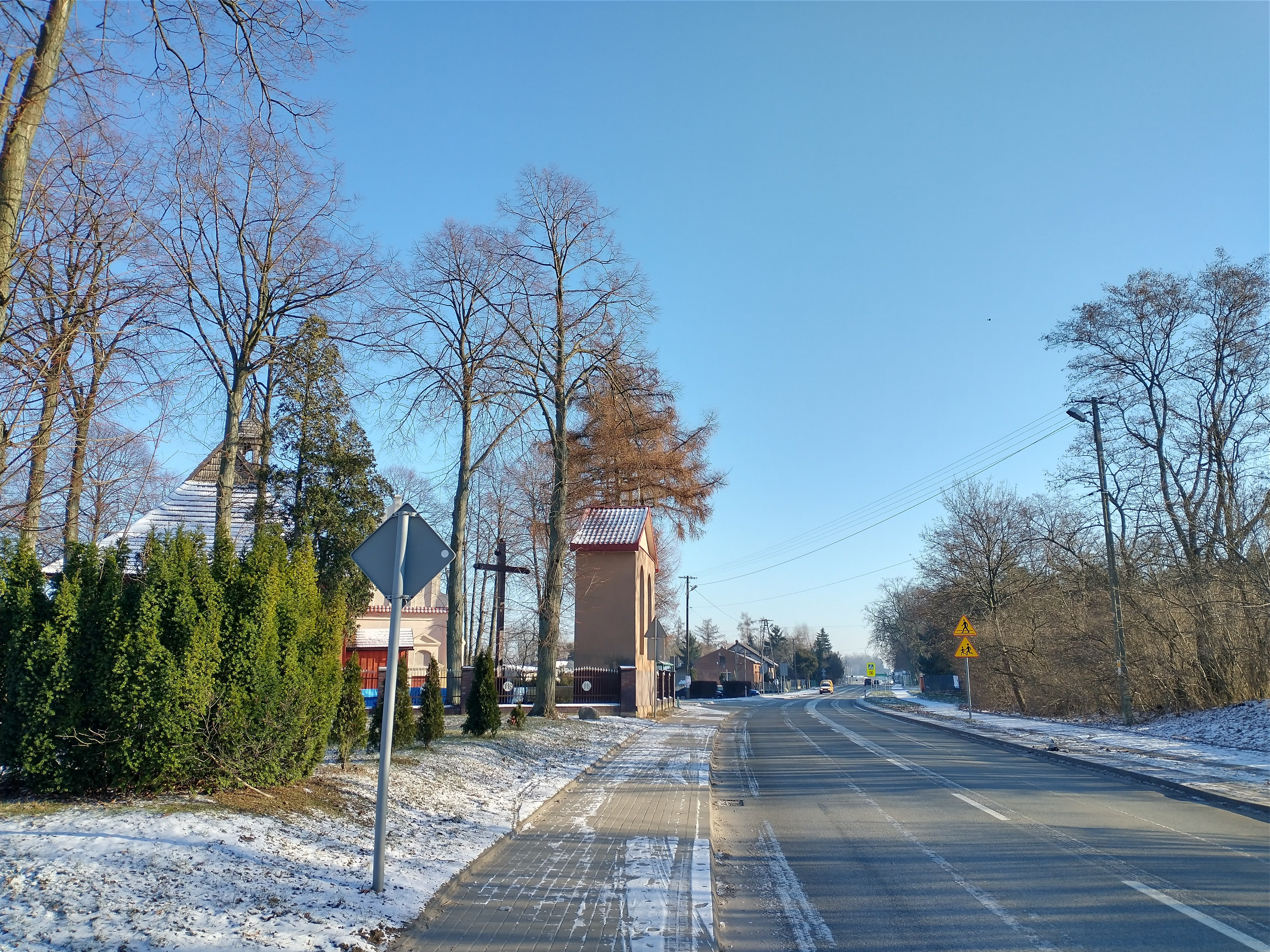

- Location within Poland
- Coordinates: 51°58′34″N 19°22′39″E
- Country: Poland
- Voivodeship: Łódź
- County: Zgierz
- Gmina: Ozorków
- Population: 130

Modlna [ˈmɔdlna] is a village in the administrative district of Gmina Ozorków, within Zgierz County, Łódź Voivodeship, in central Poland.
