= Ignacew Podleśny =

- Village
- Location within Poland
- Coordinates: 51°54′55″N 19°13′0″E
- Country: Poland
- Voivodeship: Łódź
- County: Zgierz
- Gmina: Parzęczew
- Population: 30

Ignacew Podleśny [iɡˈnat͡sɛf pɔdˈlɛɕnɨ] is a village in the administrative district of Gmina Parzęczew, within Zgierz County, Łódź Voivodeship, in central Poland.
