= Kowalewice, Łódź Voivodeship =

Kowalewice
- Village
- Location within Poland
- Coordinates: 51°56′8″N 19°17′43″E
- Country: Poland
- Voivodeship: Łódź
- County: Zgierz
- Gmina: Parzęczew
- Time zone: UTC+1 (CET)
  - Summer (DST): UTC+2 (CEST)
- Vehicle registration: EZG

Kowalewice [kɔvalɛˈvit͡sɛ] is a village in the administrative district of Gmina Parzęczew, within Zgierz County, Łódź Voivodeship, in central Poland.

== History ==
Kowalewice was a royal village, administratively located in the Łęczyca County in the Łęczyca Voivodeship in the Greater Poland Province of the Kingdom of Poland.

During the German Invasion of Poland in 1939, German forces on 11 September murdered 23 Poles in the village (see also Nazi crimes against the Polish nation).
