= Maszkowice, Łódź Voivodeship =

Maszkowice
- Village
- Location within Poland
- Coordinates: 51°58′10″N 19°19′36″E
- Country: Poland
- Voivodeship: Łódź
- County: Zgierz
- Gmina: Ozorków

Maszkowice [maʂkɔˈvit͡sɛ] is a village in the administrative district of Gmina Ozorków, within Zgierz County, Łódź Voivodeship, in central Poland.

== In popular culture ==
The 2023 Netflix drama television series Infamy was filmed in a Roma village in Maszkowice.
