= Opalanki =

- Village
- Location within Poland
- Coordinates: 51°58′34″N 19°19′23″E
- Country: Poland
- Voivodeship: Łódź
- County: Zgierz
- Gmina: Ozorków
- Population: 50

Opalanki [ɔpaˈlaŋki] is a village in the administrative district of Gmina Ozorków, within Zgierz County, Łódź Voivodeship, and in central Poland.
