= Konstantki =

- Settlement
- Location within Poland
- Coordinates: 51°56′43″N 19°15′43″E
- Country: Poland
- Voivodeship: Łódź
- County: Zgierz
- Gmina: Parzęczew

Konstantki [kɔnsˈtantki] is a settlement in the administrative district of Gmina Parzęczew, within Zgierz County, Łódź Voivodeship, in central Poland.
