= Nowe Młyny =

- Settlement
- Location within Poland
- Coordinates: 51°52′59″N 19°13′39″E
- Country: Poland
- Voivodeship: Łódź
- County: Zgierz
- Gmina: Parzęczew

Nowe Młyny [ˈnɔvɛ ˈmwɨnɨ] is a settlement in the administrative district of Gmina Parzęczew, within Zgierz County, Łódź Voivodeship, in central Poland.
