= Ostrów, Gmina Ozorków =

Ostrów
- Village
- Location within Poland
- Coordinates: 51°59′49″N 19°17′15″E
- Country: Poland
- Voivodeship: Łódź
- County: Zgierz
- Gmina: Ozorków
- Population: 90

Ostrów [ˈɔstruf] is a village in the administrative district of Gmina Ozorków, within Zgierz County, Łódź Voivodeship, in central Poland.
