= Wróblew, Zgierz County =

Wróblew
- Village
- Location within Poland
- Coordinates: 51°59′10″N 19°15′1″E
- Country: Poland
- Voivodeship: Łódź
- County: Zgierz
- Gmina: Ozorków

Wróblew [ˈvrublɛf] (1943–1945 German Sperlingslust) is a village in the administrative district of Gmina Ozorków, within Zgierz County, Łódź Voivodeship, in central Poland.
