= Czerchów =

- Village
- Location within Poland
- Coordinates: 51°59′N 19°20′E
- Country: Poland
- Voivodeship: Łódź
- County: Zgierz
- Gmina: Ozorków

Czerchów [ˈt͡ʂɛrxuf] is a village in the administrative district of Gmina Ozorków, within Zgierz County, Łódź Voivodeship, in central Poland.
