= Gmina Ozorków =

Gmina Ozorków Ozorków Commune
- Gmina

- Coat of arms
- Interactive map of Gmina Ozorków
- Coordinates (Ozorków): 51°58′0″N 19°17′0″E
- Country: Poland
- Voivodeship: Łódź
- County: Zgierz
- Seat: Ozorków

Area
  - Total: 95.17 km^{2} (36.75 sq mi)

Population (2006)
  - Total: 6,540
  - Density: 68.7/km^{2} (178/sq mi)
- Website: www.ug-ozorkow.pl

Gmina Ozorków is a rural gmina (administrative district) in Zgierz County, Łódź Voivodeship, in central Poland. Its seat is the town of Ozorków, although the town is not part of the territory of the gmina.

The gmina covers an area of 95.17 square kilometres (36.7 sq mi), and as of 2006 its total population is 6,540.

== Villages ==
Gmina Ozorków contains the villages and settlements of:

- Aleksandria
- Boczki
- Borszyn
- Cedrowice
- Cedrowice-Parcela
- Celestynów
- Czerchów
- Dybówka
- Helenów
- Katarzynów
- Konary
- Leśmierz
- Małachowice
- Małachowice-Kolonia
- Maszkowice
- Modlna
- Muchówka
- Opalanki
- Ostrów
- Parzyce
- Pełczyska
- Sierpów
- Skotniki
- Skromnica
- Śliwniki
- Sokolniki
- Sokolniki-Las
- Sokolniki-Parcela
- Solca Mała
- Solca Wielka
- Tkaczew
- Tymienica
- Wróblew

== Neighbouring gminas ==
Gmina Ozorków is bordered by the town of Ozorków and by the gminas of Góra Świętej Małgorzaty, Łęczyca, Parzęczew and Zgierz.
