= Julianki =

- Village
- Location within Poland
- Coordinates: 51°56′51″N 19°14′47″E
- Country: Poland
- Voivodeship: Łódź
- County: Zgierz
- Gmina: Parzęczew
- Population: 20

Julianki [juˈljanki] is a village in the administrative district of Gmina Parzęczew, within Zgierz County, Łódź Voivodeship, in central Poland.
