= Radzibórz =

- Village
- Location within Poland
- Coordinates: 51°54′34″N 19°14′43″E
- Country: Poland
- Voivodeship: Łódź
- County: Zgierz
- Gmina: Parzęczew
- Population: 20

Radzibórz [raˈd͡ʑibuʂ] is a village in the administrative district of Gmina Parzęczew, within Zgierz County, Łódź Voivodeship, in central Poland.
