= Cedrowice =

- Village
- Location within Poland
- Coordinates: 51°59′27″N 19°16′28″E
- Country: Poland
- Voivodeship: Łódź
- County: Zgierz
- Gmina: Ozorków

Cedrowice [t͡sɛdrɔˈvit͡sɛ] is a village in the administrative district of Gmina Ozorków, within Zgierz County, Łódź Voivodeship, in central Poland.
