= Cedrowice-Parcela =

- Village
- Location within Poland
- Coordinates: 51°58′N 19°16′E
- Country: Poland
- Voivodeship: Łódź
- County: Zgierz
- Gmina: Ozorków

Cedrowice-Parcela [t͡sɛdrɔˈvit͡sɛ parˈt͡sɛla] is a village in the administrative district of Gmina Ozorków, within Zgierz County, Łódź Voivodeship, in central Poland.
