= Skromnica =

- Village
- Location within Poland
- Coordinates: 52°1′N 19°11′E
- Country: Poland
- Voivodeship: Łódź
- County: Zgierz
- Gmina: Ozorków
- Population: 150

Skromnica [skrɔmˈnit͡sa] is a village in the administrative district of Gmina Ozorków, within Zgierz County, Łódź Voivodeship, in central Poland.
