= Parzęczew, Łódź Voivodeship =

Parzęczew
- Town
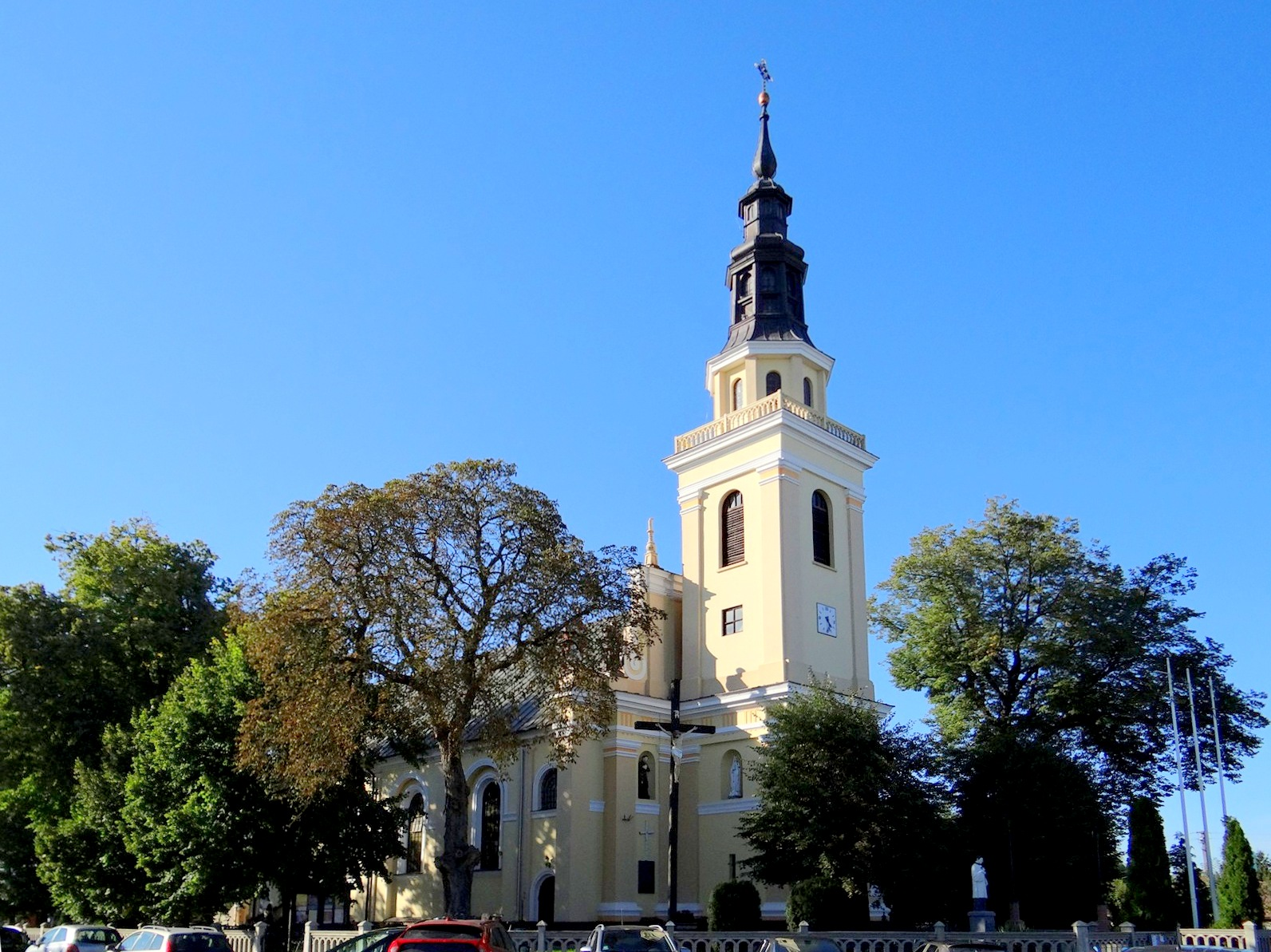
- Parish church of Virgin Mary, built 1804-1810.

- Flag Coat of arms

- Location within Poland
- Coordinates: 51°56′26″N 19°12′20″E
- Country: Poland
- Voivodeship: Łódź
- County: Zgierz
- Gmina: Parzęczew
- Town rights: 1421

Population
  - Total: 914
- Time zone: UTC+1 (CET)
  - Summer (DST): UTC+2 (CEST)
- Vehicle registration: EZG

Parzęczew [paˈʐɛnt͡ʂɛf] is a town in Zgierz County, Łódź Voivodeship, in central Poland. It is the seat of the gmina (administrative district) called Gmina Parzęczew. It lies approximately 18 km (11 mi) north-west of Zgierz and 26 km (16 mi) north-west of the regional capital Łódź. It is located within the historic Łęczyca Land.

== History ==
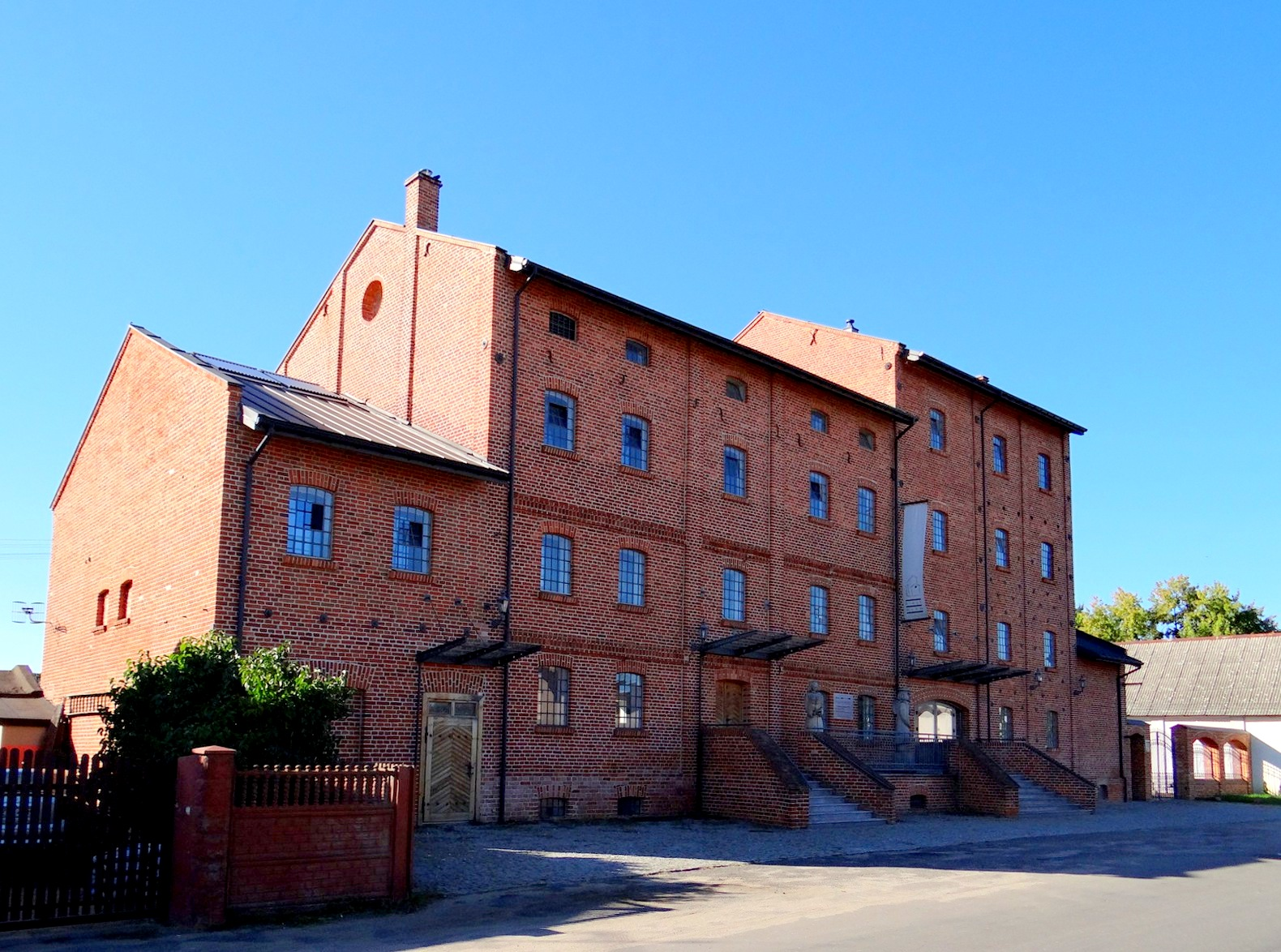
Historic mill, beginning of the 20th century

Parzęczew was originally a ducal village, on the stream called Gnida, founded by the Pomian family who came from Greater Poland. The first mention of Parzęczew dates back to 1385. In 1421, Parzęczew received town rights under a privilege issued by King Władysław II Jagiełło, as a private town of Wojciech Parzęczewski, a hunter from Łęczyca. Despite repeated confirmation of privileges by successive monarchs, the peripheral town did not develop into a larger center, probably never exceeding the number of 1,000 inhabitants. Parzęczew was a private town, administratively located in the Łęczyca County in the Łęczyca Voivodeship in the Greater Poland Province of the Kingdom of Poland.

It was annexed by Prussia in the Second Partition of Poland in 1793. In 1807, it was regained by Poles and included within the short-lived Duchy of Warsaw. After its dissolution in 1815, Parzęczew fell to the Russian Partition of Poland. Parzęczew's town rights were revoked in 1870 under the Tsar's administrative reform. After World War I, Poland regained independence and control of Parzęczew. In the 1921 census, 93.2% of the population declared Polish nationality and 6.3% declared Jewish nationality.

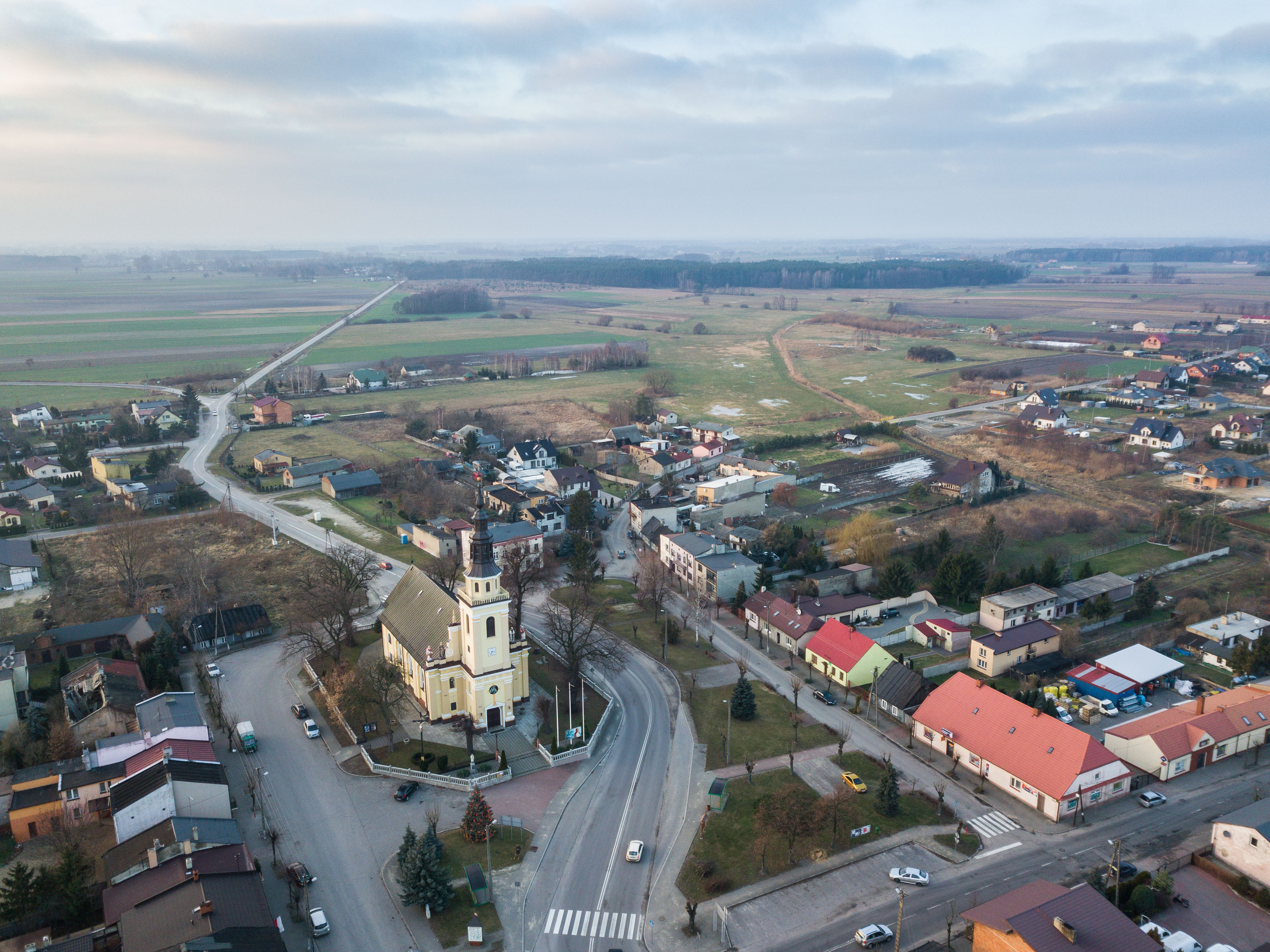
Aerial view of Parzęczew

Following the joint German-Soviet invasion of Poland, which started World War II in September 1939, Parzęczew was occupied by Germany, and annexed into the Third Reich. In 1941–1942, the German gendarmerie carried out expulsions of Poles, whose houses and farms were then handed over to new German colonists as part of the Lebensraum policy. The Poles were soon enslaved as forced labour and either sent to Germany, German-occupied France or Austria or to German colonists in the county. The Jewish minority was murdered in the Holocaust, and the wooden synagogue from the 18th century was destroyed. In 1943 the name of the village was changed to Parnstädt in attempt to erase traces of Polish origin. Soviet troops occupied Parzęczew on 19 January 1945, and afterwards it was restored to Poland.

In 1975–1998, the town was located in the then Łódź Voivodeship.

To this day, Parzęczew has retained the foundations of the urban spatial layout with a rectangular market square, in the center of which there is a church founded at the beginning of the 19th century by the Stokowski family, and small-town buildings around.

Ryszard Nowakowski has been the mayor of Parzęczew since 2002. As of 2022, the village had a population of 914.

On 1 January 2024, Parzęczew regained town rights after 154 years.
