= Helenów, Gmina Ozorków =

Helenów
- Village
- Location within Poland
- Coordinates: 51°57′N 19°19′E
- Country: Poland
- Voivodeship: Łódź
- County: Zgierz
- Gmina: Ozorków
- Population: 170

Helenów [xɛˈlɛnuf] is a village in the administrative district of Gmina Ozorków, within Zgierz County, Łódź Voivodeship, in central Poland.
