= Gołaszyny =

- Settlement
- Location within Poland
- Coordinates: 51°55′N 19°10′E
- Country: Poland
- Voivodeship: Łódź
- County: Zgierz
- Gmina: Parzęczew

Gołaszyny [ɡɔwaˈʂɨnɨ] is a settlement in the administrative district of Gmina Parzęczew, within Zgierz County, Łódź Voivodeship, in central Poland.
