= Leźnica Wielka-Osiedle =

Village in Gmina Parzęczew, Poland

- Village
- Location within Poland
- Coordinates: 51°59′48″N 19°08′39″E
- Country: Poland
- Voivodeship: Łódź
- County: Zgierz
- Gmina: Parzęczew
- Population (approx.): 1,500

Leźnica Wielka-Osiedle [lɛʑˈnit͡sa ˈvjɛlka ɔˈɕɛdlɛ] is a village in the administrative district of Gmina Parzęczew, within Zgierz County, Łódź Voivodeship, in central Poland.

The village has an approximate population of 1,500.
