= Celestynów, Zgierz County =

Celestynów
- Village
- Location within Poland
- Coordinates: 51°58′7″N 19°24′24″E
- Country: Poland
- Voivodeship: Łódź
- County: Zgierz
- Gmina: Ozorków

Celestynów (IPA: [t͡sɛlɛsˈtɨnuf]) is a village in the administrative district of Gmina Ozorków, within Zgierz County, Łódź Voivodeship, in central Poland.
