= Sierpów =

- Village
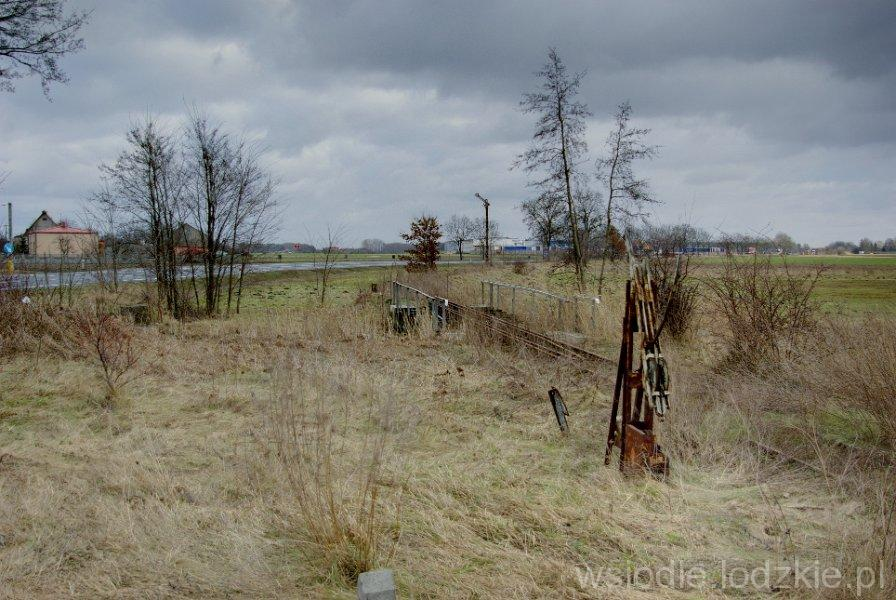

- Location within Poland
- Coordinates: 52°1′N 19°15′E
- Country: Poland
- Voivodeship: Łódź
- County: Zgierz
- Gmina: Ozorków

Sierpów [ˈɕɛrpuf] is a village in the administrative district of Gmina Ozorków, within Zgierz County, Łódź Voivodeship, in central Poland.
