= Małachowice =

- Village
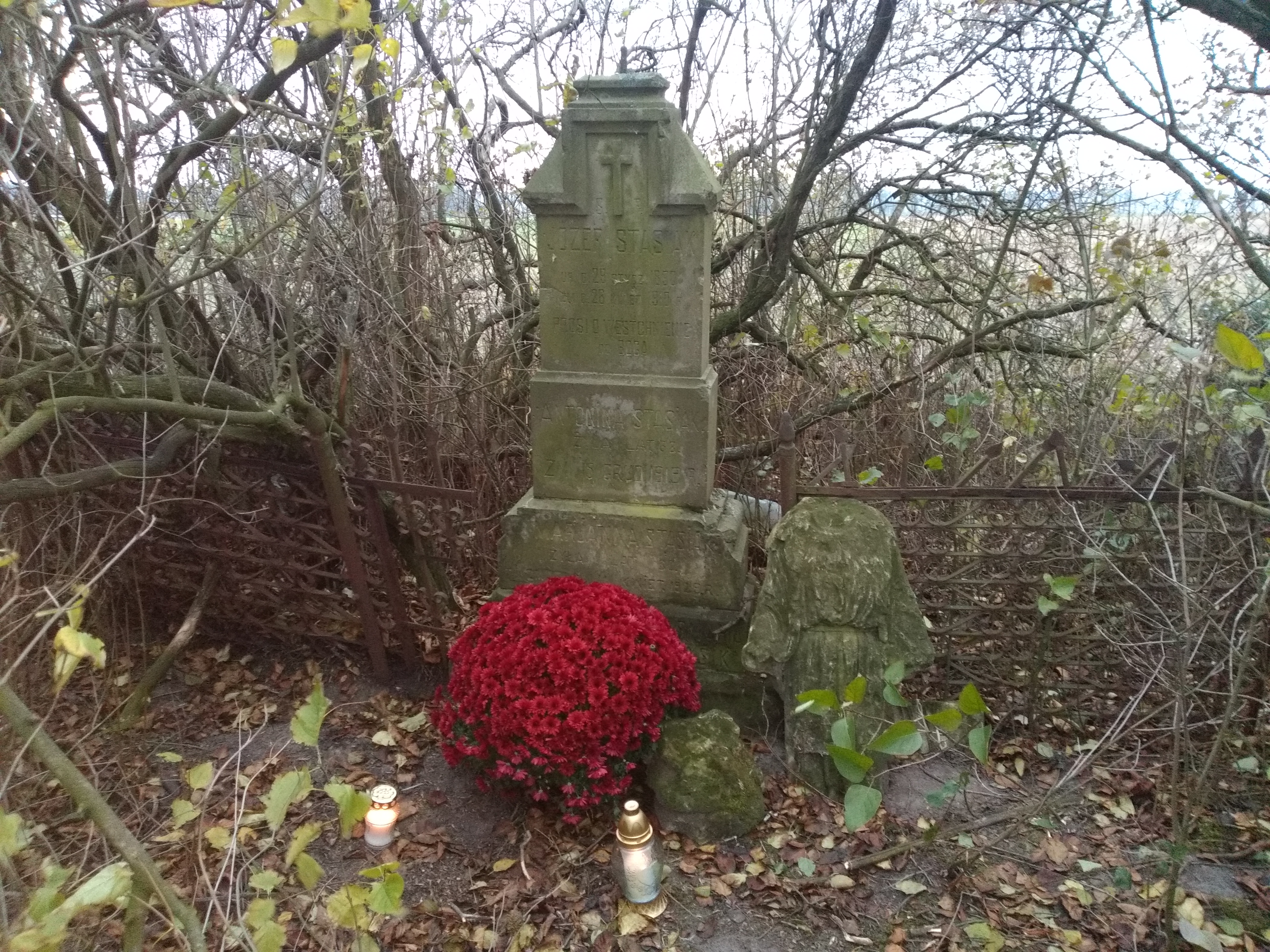

- Location within Poland
- Coordinates: 51°59′40″N 19°21′25″E
- Country: Poland
- Voivodeship: Łódź
- County: Zgierz
- Gmina: Ozorków

Małachowice [mawaxɔˈvit͡sɛ] is a village in the administrative district of Gmina Ozorków, within Zgierz County, Łódź Voivodeship, in central Poland.
