= Chrząstówek, Zgierz County =

Settlement in Gmina Parzęczew, Poland

Chrząstówek
- Settlement
- Location within Poland
- Coordinates: 51°57′20″N 19°10′28″E
- Country: Poland
- Voivodeship: Łódź
- County: Zgierz
- Gmina: Parzęczew

Chrząstówek [xʂɔ̃sˈtuvɛk] is a settlement in the administrative district of Gmina Parzęczew, within Zgierz County, Łódź Voivodeship, in central Poland.
