= Dybówka =

- Village
- Location within Poland
- Coordinates: 51°59′40″N 19°20′11″E
- Country: Poland
- Voivodeship: Łódź
- County: Zgierz
- Gmina: Ozorków
- Population: 50

Dybówka [dɨˈbufka] is a village in the administrative district of Gmina Ozorków, within Zgierz County, Łódź Voivodeship, in central Poland.
