= Mariampol, Zgierz County =

Mariampol
- Village
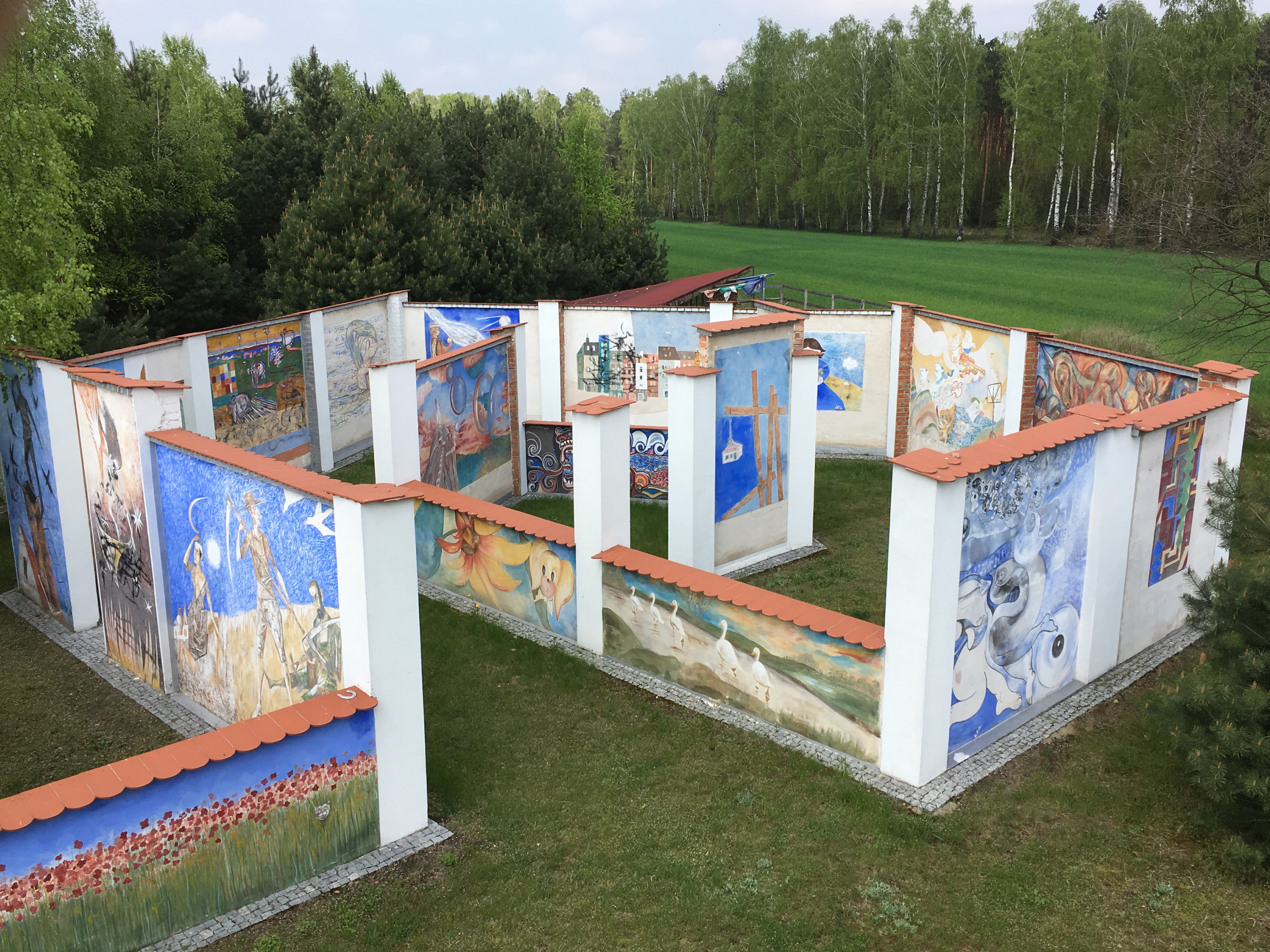
- Fresco labyrinth

- Location within Poland
- Coordinates: 51°54′4″N 19°13′30″E
- Country: Poland
- Voivodeship: Łódź
- County: Zgierz
- Gmina: Parzęczew

Mariampol [maˈrjampɔl] is a village in the administrative district of Gmina Parzęczew, within Zgierz County, Łódź Voivodeship, in central Poland.
