= Sokolniki-Las =

- Village
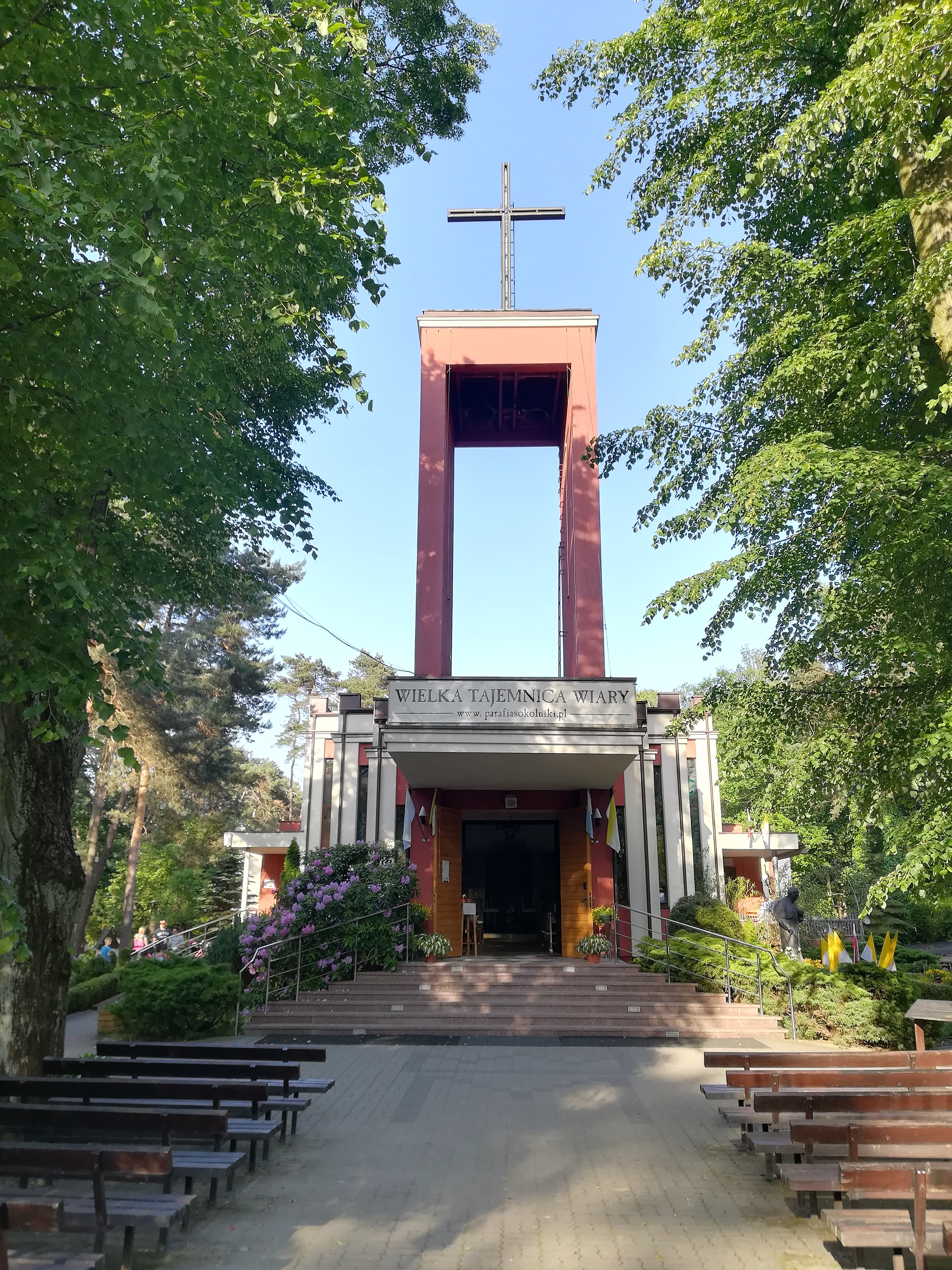
- Catholic church

- Location within Poland
- Coordinates: 51°58′N 19°22′E
- Country: Poland
- Voivodeship: Łódź
- County: Zgierz
- Gmina: Ozorków
- Population (approx.): 860

Sokolniki-Las [sɔkɔlˈniki ˈlas] is a village in the administrative district of Gmina Ozorków, within Zgierz County, Łódź Voivodeship, in central Poland.

The village has an approximate population of 860.
