= Ignacew Rozlazły =

- Village
- Location within Poland
- Coordinates: 51°56′N 19°13′E
- Country: Poland
- Voivodeship: Łódź
- County: Zgierz
- Gmina: Parzęczew

Ignacew Rozlazły [iɡˈnat͡sɛf rɔˈzlazwɨ] is a village in the administrative district of Gmina Parzęczew, within Zgierz County, Łódź Voivodeship, in central Poland.
