= Ignacew Folwarczny =

- Village
- Location within Poland
- Coordinates: 51°55′N 19°11′E
- Country: Poland
- Voivodeship: Łódź
- County: Zgierz
- Gmina: Parzęczew

Ignacew Folwarczny [iɡˈnat͡sɛf fɔlˈvart͡ʂnɨ] is a village in the administrative district of Gmina Parzęczew, within Zgierz County, Łódź Voivodeship, in central Poland.
