= Chrząstów Wielki =

- Village
- Location within Poland
- Coordinates: 51°58′N 19°11′E
- Country: Poland
- Voivodeship: Łódź
- County: Zgierz
- Gmina: Parzęczew
- Population (approx.): 85

Chrząstów Wielki (Polish pronunciation: [ˈxʂɔ̃stuv ˈvjɛlkʲi]) is a village in the administrative district of Gmina Parzęczew, within Zgierz County, Łódź Voivodeship, in central Poland.

The village has an approximate population of 85.
