= Florentynów, Zgierz County =

Florentynów
- Village
- Location within Poland
- Coordinates: 51°54′6″N 19°12′27″E
- Country: Poland
- Voivodeship: Łódź
- County: Zgierz
- Gmina: Parzęczew

Florentynów [flɔrɛnˈtɨnuf] is a village in the administrative district of Gmina Parzęczew, within Zgierz County, Łódź Voivodeship, in central Poland.
