= Pustkowa Góra =

- Village
- Location within Poland
- Coordinates: 51°54′52″N 19°16′44″E
- Country: Poland
- Voivodeship: Łódź
- County: Zgierz
- Gmina: Parzęczew

Pustkowa Góra [pustˈkɔva ˈɡura] is a village in the administrative district of Gmina Parzęczew, within Zgierz County, Łódź Voivodeship, in central Poland.
