= Sokola Góra, Zgierz County =

Sokola Góra
- Village
- Location within Poland
- Coordinates: 51°53′21″N 19°12′23″E
- Country: Poland
- Voivodeship: Łódź
- County: Zgierz
- Gmina: Parzęczew

Sokola Góra [sɔˈkɔla ˈɡura] is a village in the administrative district of Gmina Parzęczew, within Zgierz County, Łódź Voivodeship, in central Poland.
