= Konary, Zgierz County =

Konary
- Village
- Location within Poland
- Coordinates: 52°1′19″N 19°15′2″E
- Country: Poland
- Voivodeship: Łódź
- County: Zgierz
- Gmina: Ozorków

Konary [kɔˈnarɨ] is a village in the administrative district of Gmina Ozorków, within Zgierz County, Łódź Voivodeship, in central Poland.
