= Janów, Gmina Parzęczew =

Janów
- Village
- Location within Poland
- Coordinates: 51°58′17″N 19°13′1″E
- Country: Poland
- Voivodeship: Łódź
- County: Zgierz
- Gmina: Parzęczew
- Population: 60

Janów [ˈjanuf] is a village in the administrative district of Gmina Parzęczew, within Zgierz County, Łódź Voivodeship, in central Poland.
