= Aleksandria, Łódź Voivodeship =

Aleksandria
- Village
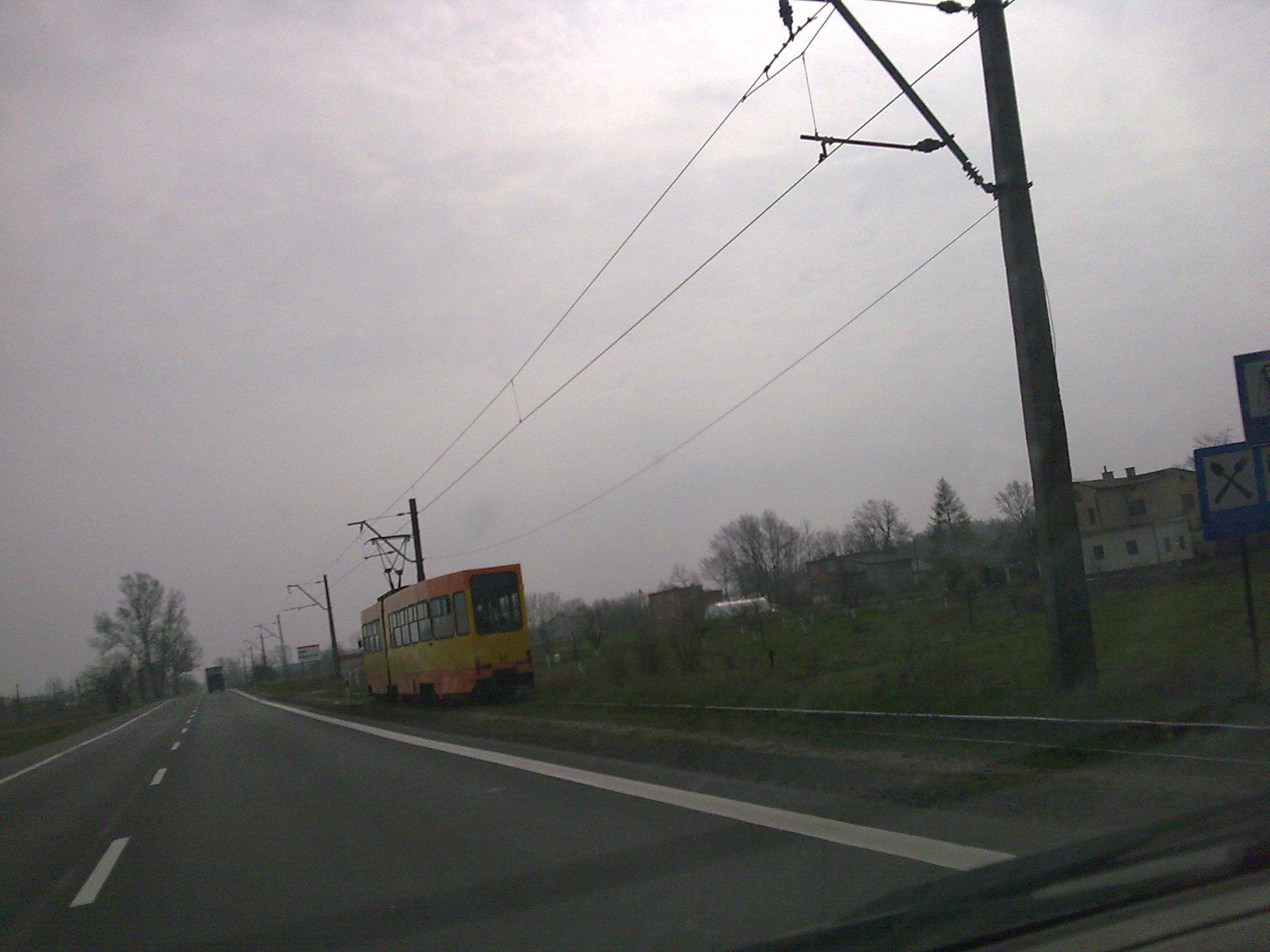

- Location within Poland
- Coordinates: 51°56′32″N 19°19′47″E
- Country: Poland
- Voivodeship: Łódź
- County: Zgierz
- Gmina: Ozorków
- Time zone: UTC+1 (CET)
  - Summer (DST): UTC+2 (CEST)
- Postal code: 95-035
- ISO 3166 code: POL
- Vehicle registration: EMU

Aleksandria [alɛkˈsandrja] is a village in the administrative district of Gmina Ozorków, within Zgierz County, Łódź Voivodeship, in central Poland.
