= Leźnica Wielka =

- Village
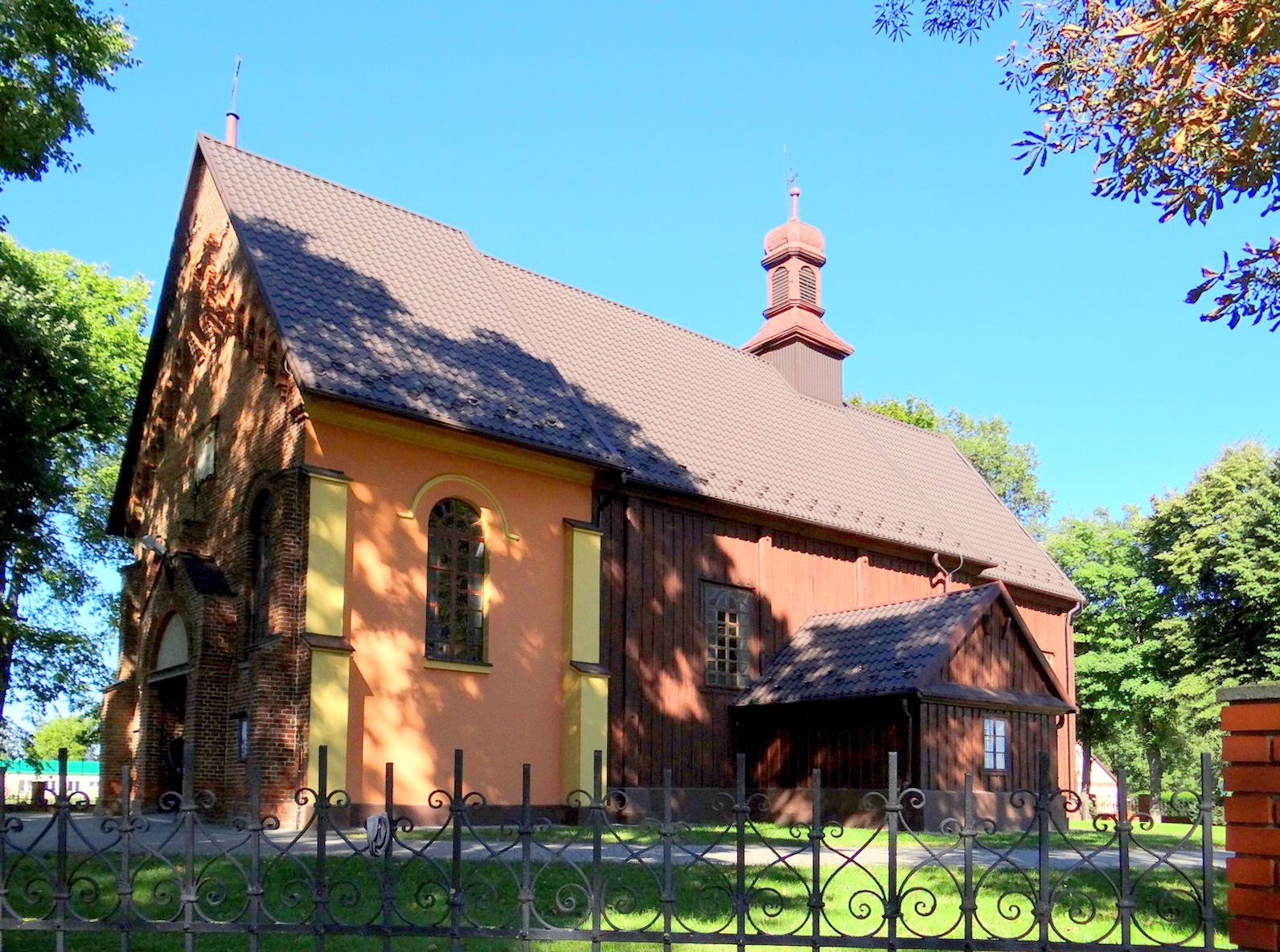
- Catholic church

- Location within Poland
- Coordinates: 51°59′40″N 19°9′42″E
- Country: Poland
- Voivodeship: Łódź
- County: Zgierz
- Gmina: Parzęczew
- Population: 40

Leźnica Wielka [lɛʑˈnit͡sa ˈvjɛlka] is a village in the administrative district of Gmina Parzęczew, within Zgierz County, Łódź Voivodeship, in central Poland.
