= Stary Chrząstów =

- Village
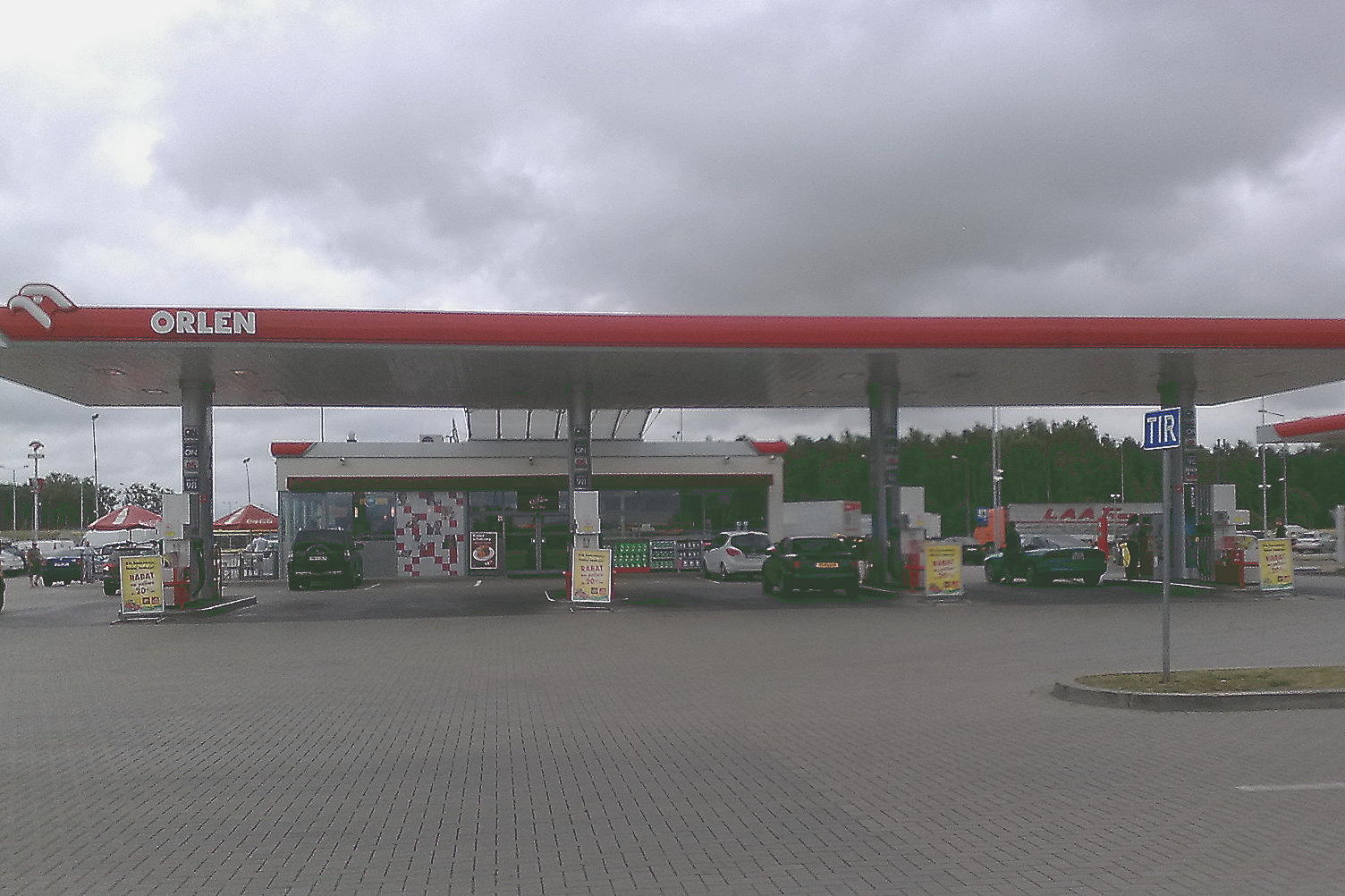

- Location within Poland
- Coordinates: 51°56′43″N 19°10′1″E
- Country: Poland
- Voivodeship: Łódź
- County: Zgierz
- Gmina: Parzęczew

Stary Chrząstów [ˈstarɨ ˈxʂɔ̃stuf] is a village in the administrative district of Gmina Parzęczew, within Zgierz County, Łódź Voivodeship, in central Poland.
