= Muchówka, Łódź Voivodeship =

Muchówka
- Village
- Location within Poland
- Coordinates: 52°00′32.8″N 19°16′41.5″E
- Country: Poland
- Voivodeship: Łódź
- County: Zgierz
- Gmina: Ozorków

Muchówka [muˈxufka] is a village in the administrative district of Gmina Ozorków, within Zgierz County, Łódź Voivodeship, in central Poland.
