= Sokolniki-Parcela =

- Village
- Location within Poland
- Coordinates: 51°58′55″N 19°20′48″E
- Country: Poland
- Voivodeship: Łódź
- County: Zgierz
- Gmina: Ozorków

Sokolniki-Parcela [sɔkɔlˈniki parˈt͡sɛla] is a village in the administrative district of Gmina Ozorków, within Zgierz County, Łódź Voivodeship, in central Poland.
