= Różyce, Zgierz County =

Różyce
- Village
- Location within Poland
- Coordinates: 51°58′14″N 19°9′29″E
- Country: Poland
- Voivodeship: Łódź
- County: Zgierz
- Gmina: Parzęczew

Różyce [ruˈʐɨt͡sɛ] is a village in the administrative district of Gmina Parzęczew, within Zgierz County, Łódź Voivodeship, in central Poland.
