= Śliwniki, Gmina Ozorków =

Śliwniki
- Village
- Location within Poland
- Coordinates: 51°58′14″N 19°14′12″E
- Country: Poland
- Voivodeship: Łódź
- County: Zgierz
- Gmina: Ozorków

Śliwniki [ɕlivˈniki] is a village in the administrative district of Gmina Ozorków, within Zgierz County, Łódź Voivodeship, in central Poland.
