= Piaskowice, Łódź Voivodeship =

Piaskowice
- Village
- Location within Poland
- Coordinates: 51°56′46″N 19°13′27″E
- Country: Poland
- Voivodeship: Łódź
- County: Zgierz
- Gmina: Parzęczew
- Population: 100

Piaskowice [pjaskɔˈvit͡sɛ] is a village in the administrative district of Gmina Parzęczew, within Zgierz County, Łódź Voivodeship, in central Poland.
