= Duraj, Poland =

Duraj
- Village
- Location within Poland
- Coordinates: 51°54′43″N 19°17′20″E
- Country: Poland
- Voivodeship: Łódź
- County: Zgierz
- Gmina: Parzęczew
- Population: 30

Duraj [ˈdurai̯] is a village in the administrative district of Gmina Parzęczew, within Zgierz County, Łódź Voivodeship, in central Poland.
