= Duraj =

دوراج Dūrāj Dōrāj
- Location in Afghanistan
- Coordinates: 37°55′55″N 70°43′12″E
- Country: Afghanistan
- Province: Badakhshan Province
- District: Kuf Ab
- Time zone: + 4.30

Duraj دوراج is a village in Badakhshan Province in north-eastern Afghanistan. It is located on the Darr-i-Kuf Ab River, in the vicinity of the Safid Khers mountains.
