= Różyce Żmijowe =

- Village
- Location within Poland
- Coordinates: 51°59′9″N 19°8′47″E
- Country: Poland
- Voivodeship: Łódź
- County: Zgierz
- Gmina: Parzęczew

Różyce Żmijowe [ruˈʐɨt͡sɛ ʐmiˈjɔvɛ] is a village in the administrative district of Gmina Parzęczew, within Zgierz County, Łódź Voivodeship, in central Poland.
