= Parzyce, Łódź Voivodeship =

Parzyce
- Village
- Location within Poland
- Coordinates: 52°0′20″N 19°16′4″E
- Country: Poland
- Voivodeship: Łódź
- County: Zgierz
- Gmina: Ozorków

Parzyce [paˈʐɨt͡sɛ] is a village in the administrative district of Gmina Ozorków, within Zgierz County, Łódź Voivodeship, in central Poland.
