= Anglo-Polish Radio =

ORLA.fm
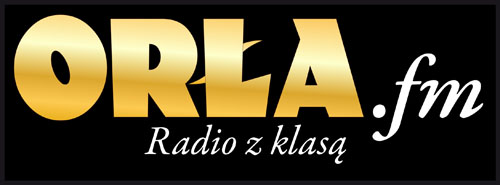
- ORLA.fm logo since 2015

London; England
- Broadcast area: United Kingdom and Ireland

Programming
- Languages: Polish; English

History
- First air date: 18 May 2006; 19 years ago
- Former names: Radio ORLA; Anglo-Polish Radio

Links
- Website: orla.fm (archived copy)

Anglo-Polish Radio (also known as Radio ORLA and ORLA.fm) is an on-demand bilingual audio content producer for Polish and English-speaking audiences in the United Kingdom and Ireland, formerly a broadcast radio station. The station was based in London and also broadcast to listeners in Poland. Bilingual journalist George Matlock, the son of two Poles, is Radio ORLA's founder. Since 18 May 2015, the station has been exclusively available as a podcast publisher. In 2020 ORLA.fm moved to a new website ORLAfm.Media in preparation for its relaunch with new content from 1 February 2022.

== History ==
=== As a radio station ===
ORLA.fm was launched on 18 May 2006 by George Matlock, a journalist since 1990, after the BBC's decision to close many European language radio services in December of the previous year. The launch date was chosen to mark the birthdate of the Polish Pope John Paul II. Matlock had organised a memorial service in London for the Pope's death in 2004. "Orla" in the station name is the Polish word for eagle, Poland's national symbol. Initially broadcasting exclusively online to an audience of 60,000, ORLA.fm was a community-based radio station which also accepts advertising and covered major Polish community events. The station's first studio was in Haven Green, right next to Ealing Broadway rail station and housed in the same building as the publication Polski Goniec, with whom the station had a short-lived collaboration.

The radio station aired more English-language music than Polish. The station adopted a music rotation system, airing music from the last 50 years. In January, for instance, music that had charted in January of previous years would be played, and the same for each month of the year. Chill-out and alternative music also frequently received airtime. Initially, 60% of output was in Polish and 40% was in English. The station has interviewed Polish Presidents (Kwasniewski, Kaczynski and Komorowski) as well as the last Polish president-in-exile, Ryszard Kaczorowski. The station co-produced a 4-part bi-lingual biography of Prince Michal Kleofas Oginski, reportedly the composer of the Polish national anthem. The narrator was a direct descendant of Oginski, Iwo Zaluski. Other cultural features have included a radio play about Frederik Chopin on his last tour, a visit to Britain, with musical performances by Peter Katin and others on the very same two pianos which Chopin performed on in the UK.

Radio ORLA.fm has been a partner of Hayes FM 91.8 in west London since September 2007, when Hayes launched, and provided Hayes with the weekly English-language cultural show London Bridge, hosted by presenter George Matlock and "Fine" Art Skupienski. A recent addition has been a Briton, Kingsley Hamilton, who offers his take on Poles. London Bridge ceased to broadcast in 2014, although podcasts of many of the shows are in the process of being rolled out on the station's on-demand platform.

In January 2010, Radio ORLA.fm moved to a studio at the Ealing, Hammersmith and West London College, where it trained media students aged 16–18 years for a BTEC in radio reporting and production work. In January 2012, ORLA.fm launched an iPhone app and in October 2013 an Android app.

In October 2013, ORLA.fm launched a marketing and content alliance with London-based Polish newspaper Nowy Czas.

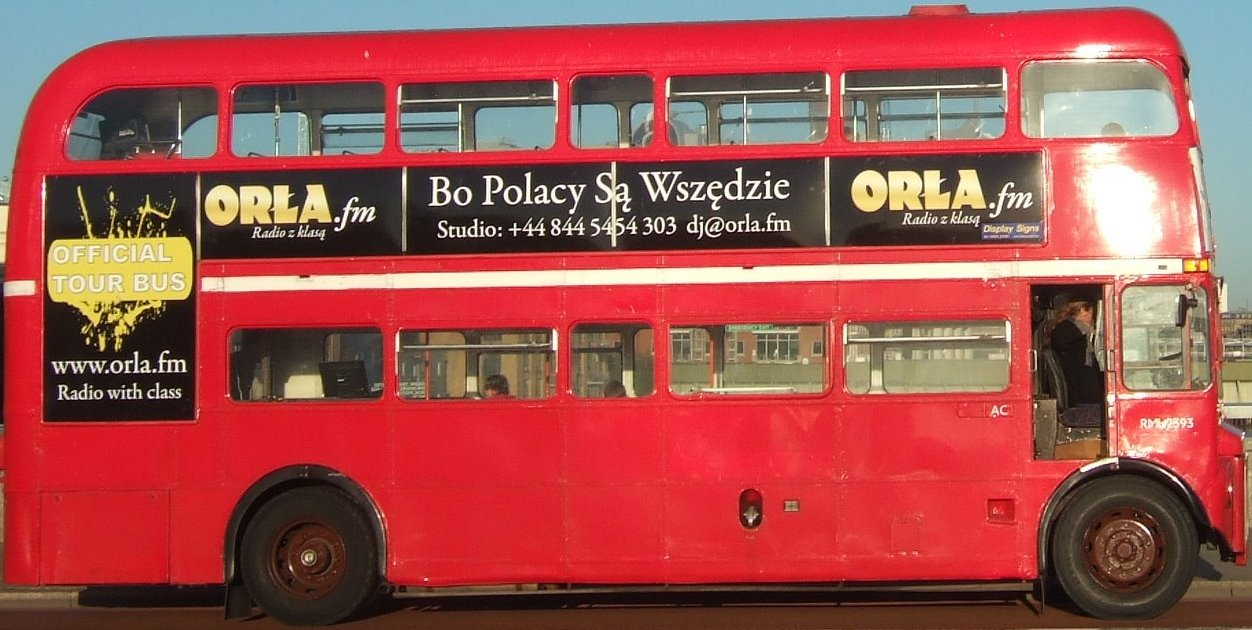
ORLA.fm London routemaster bus since 2010. It can be hired by advertisers

=== Shift to on-demand ===
In 2014, a strategic review of the station by its founder concluded that listeners were mostly drawn to the station by its unique content, such as interviews and news reports, and that there was a saturation of music radio stations competing with on-demand music vendors such as Spotify and other content providers like YouTube. The decision was taken to relaunch as an on-demand content provider, dropping music and live broadcasts.

Since the strategic review, ORLA.fm has focused on on-demand podcasts and its website is HTML5-compliant, ensuring content can be easily streamed or downloaded from any browser on devices like smartphones and tablets.

=== Milestones ===
Early logo of ORLA.fm from 2007

- ORLA.fm was the first Polish radio station to broadcast in FM solely to London when it partnered with Hayes 91.8 FM in September 2007. Until then, the only British-Polish programming on FM had been BBC CWR's one-hour a week show in the Midlands since 1990 (which ended in 2012). The short-lived Radio Supermowa in London was the first to broadcast a show on DAB for six months in 2005.
- ORLA.fm was the only radio station in Great Britain to ever interview long-serving Polish Ambassador Barbara Tuge-Erecinska, on a visit to the ORLA.fm Ealing Broadway studios in spring 2009.
- ORLA.fm's first honorary patron was named in 2010 after the Smolensk air crash to be Lady Karolina Kaczorowski, the recent widow of the last Polish president-in-exile Ryszard Kaczorowski. Lady Karolina has maintained the association ever since.

== See also ==
- List of Polish-language radio stations
