= Gmina Parzęczew =

Gmina Parzęczew Parzęczew Commune
- Gmina
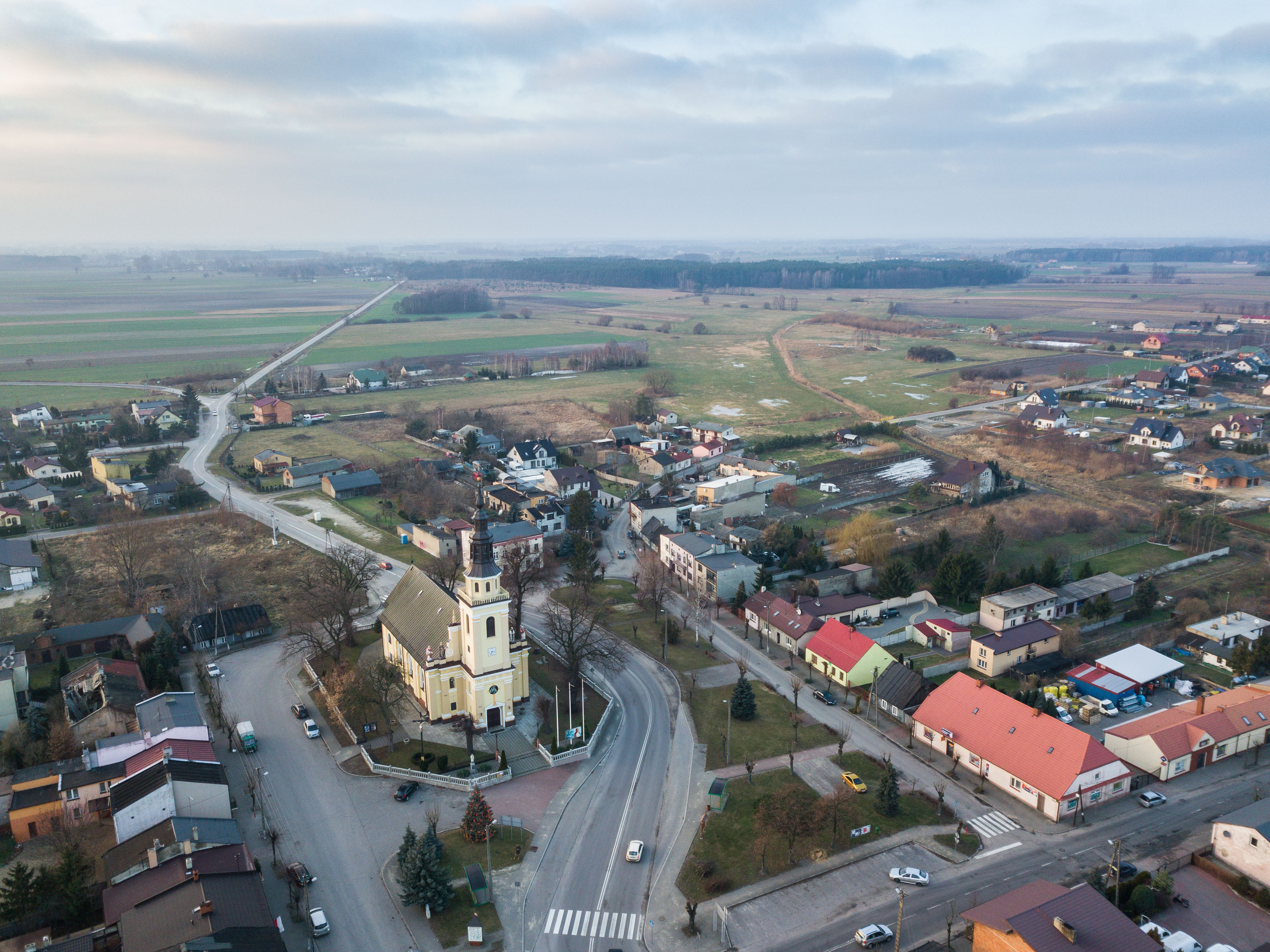

- Flag Coat of arms
- Interactive map of Gmina Parzęczew
- Coordinates (Parzęczew): 51°56′26″N 19°12′20″E
- Country: Poland
- Voivodeship: Łódź
- County: Zgierz
- Seat: Parzęczew

Area
  - Total: 103.82 km^{2} (40.09 sq mi)

Population (2006)
  - Total: 5,222
  - Density: 50.30/km^{2} (130.3/sq mi)
- Website: www.parzeczew.pl

Gmina Parzęczew is an urban-rural gmina (administrative district) in Zgierz County, Łódź Voivodeship, in central Poland. Its seat is the town of Parzęczew, which lies approximately 18 kilometres (11 mi) north-west of Zgierz and 26 km (16 mi) north-west of the regional capital Łódź.

The gmina covers an area of 103.82 square kilometres (40.1 sq mi), and as of 2006 its total population is 5,222.

== Villages ==
Gmina Parzęczew contains the villages and settlements of:

- Anastazew
- Bibianów
- Chociszew
- Chrząstów Wielki
- Chrząstówek
- Duraj
- Florentynów
- Florianki
- Gołaszyny
- Ignacew Folwarczny
- Ignacew Parzęczewski
- Ignacew Podleśny
- Ignacew Rozlazły
- Janów
- Julianki
- Konstantki
- Kowalewice
- Kozikówka
- Leźnica Wielka
- Leźnica Wielka-Osiedle
- Mamień
- Mariampol
- Mikołajew
- Mrożewice
- Nowa Jerozolima
- Nowe Młyny
- Opole
- Orła
- Parzęczew
- Piaskowice
- Pustkowa Góra
- Radzibórz
- Różyce
- Różyce Żmijowe
- Skórka
- Śliwniki
- Śniatowa
- Sokola Góra
- Stary Chrząstów
- Sulimy
- Tkaczewska Góra
- Trojany
- Wielka Wieś
- Wytrzyszczki
- Zelgoszcz

== Neighbouring gminas ==
Gmina Parzęczew is bordered by the town of Ozorków and by the gminas of Aleksandrów Łódzki, Dalików, Łęczyca, Ozorków, Wartkowice and Zgierz.
