= Solca Wielka =

- Village
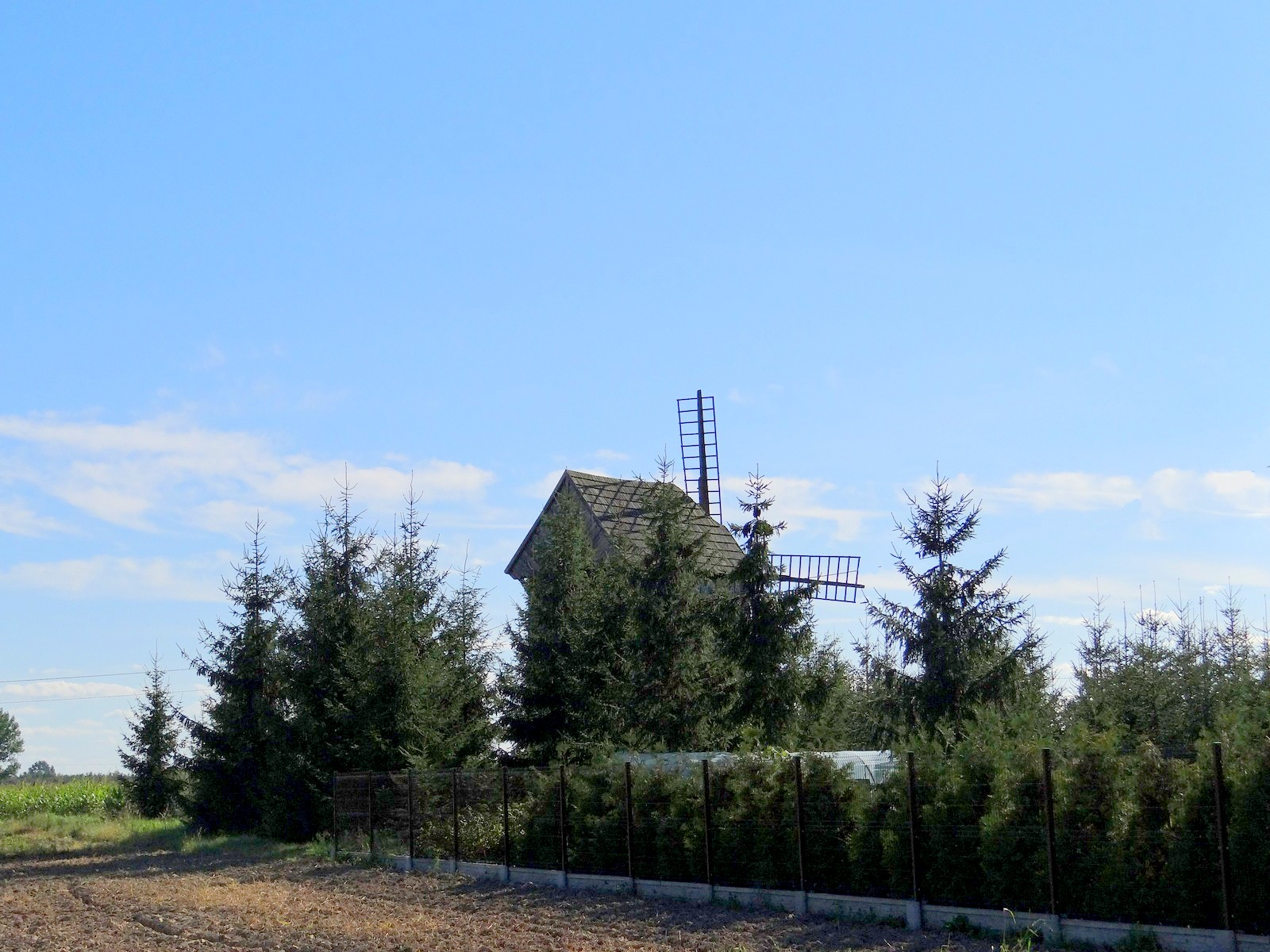

- Location within Poland
- Coordinates: 52°0′N 19°12′E
- Country: Poland
- Voivodeship: Łódź
- County: Zgierz
- Gmina: Ozorków

Solca Wielka [ˈsɔlt͡sa ˈvjɛlka] is a village in the administrative district of Gmina Ozorków, within Zgierz County, Łódź Voivodeship, in central Poland.
