= Orła =

- Village
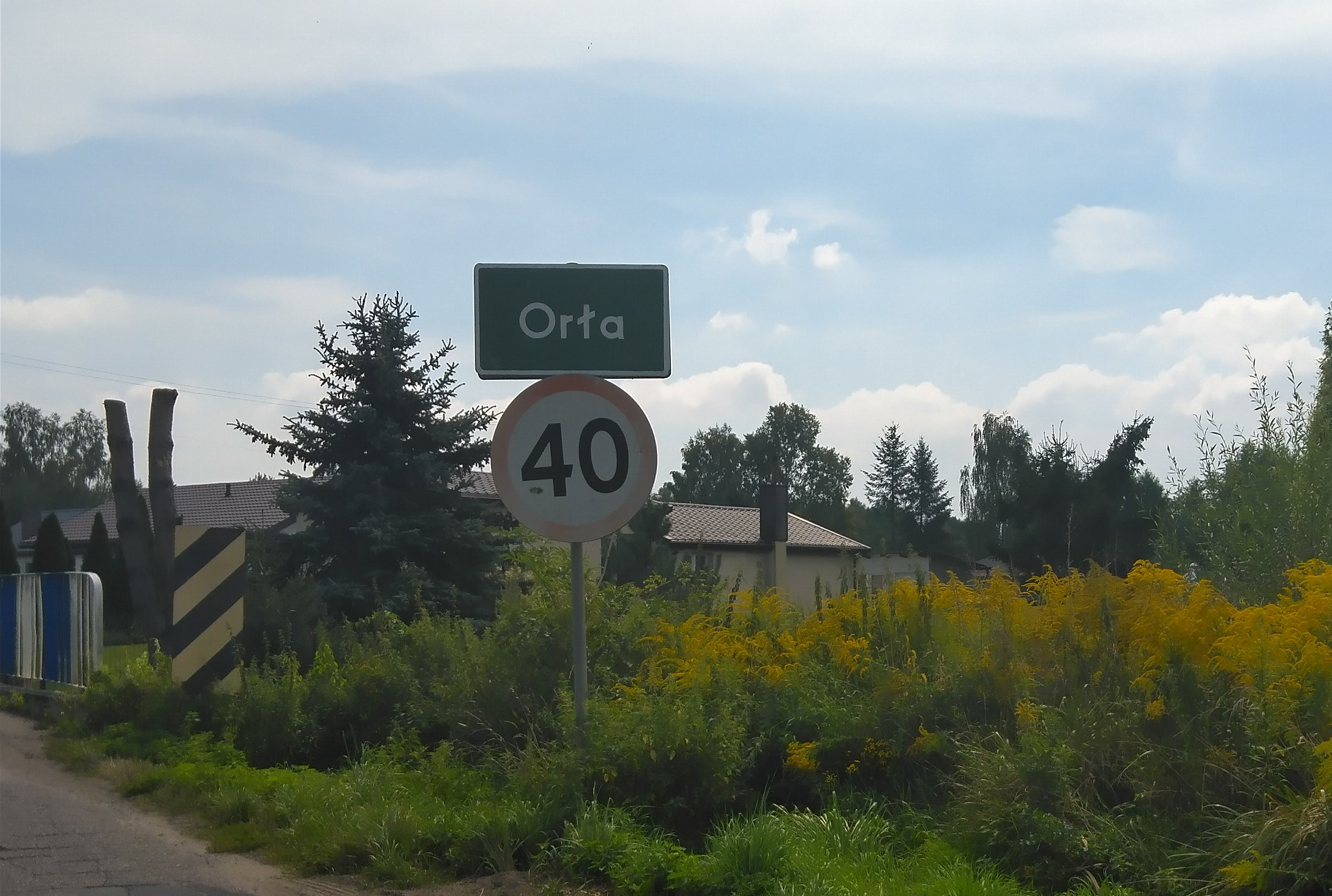

- Location within Poland
- Coordinates: 51°55′18″N 19°17′5″E
- Country: Poland
- Voivodeship: Łódź
- County: Zgierz
- Gmina: Parzęczew

Orła [ˈɔrwa] is a village in the administrative district of Gmina Parzęczew, within Zgierz County, Łódź Voivodeship, in central Poland.
