= Skotniki, Gmina Ozorków =

Skotniki
- Village
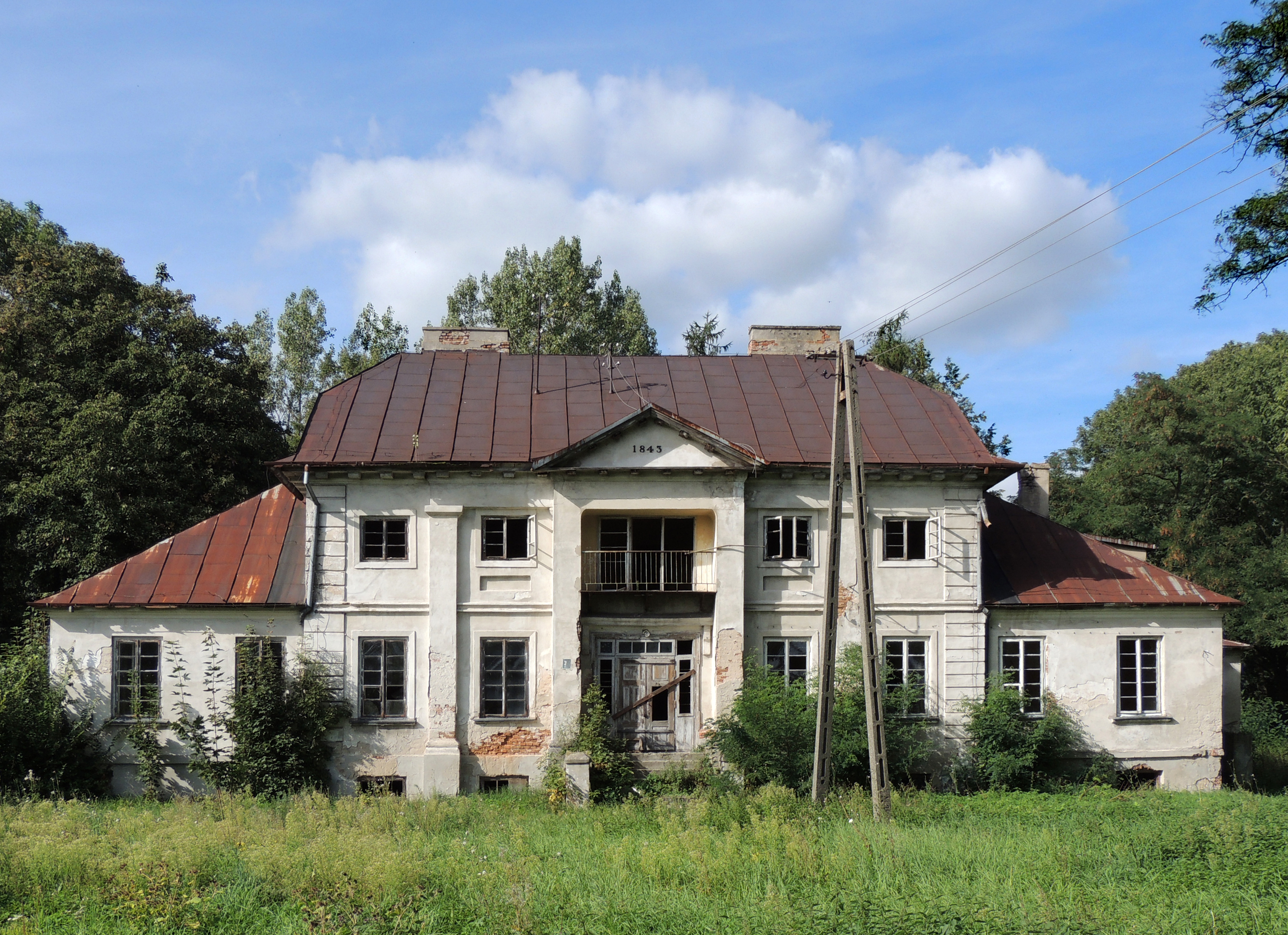
- Manor

- Location within Poland
- Coordinates: 52°0′23″N 19°19′44″E
- Country: Poland
- Voivodeship: Łódź
- County: Zgierz
- Gmina: Ozorków

Skotniki [skɔtˈɲiki] is a village in the administrative district of Gmina Ozorków, within Zgierz County, Łódź Voivodeship, in central Poland.
