= Nowa Jerozolima, Łódź Voivodeship =

Nowa Jerozolima
- Village
- Location within Poland
- Coordinates: 51°55′09″N 19°13′49″E
- Country: Poland
- Voivodeship: Łódź
- County: Zgierz
- Gmina: Parzęczew

Nowa Jerozolima [ˈnɔva jɛrɔzɔˈlima] ("New Jerusalem") is a village in the administrative district of Gmina Parzęczew, within Zgierz County, Łódź Voivodeship, in central Poland.
