= Skórka, Łódź Voivodeship =

Skórka
- Village
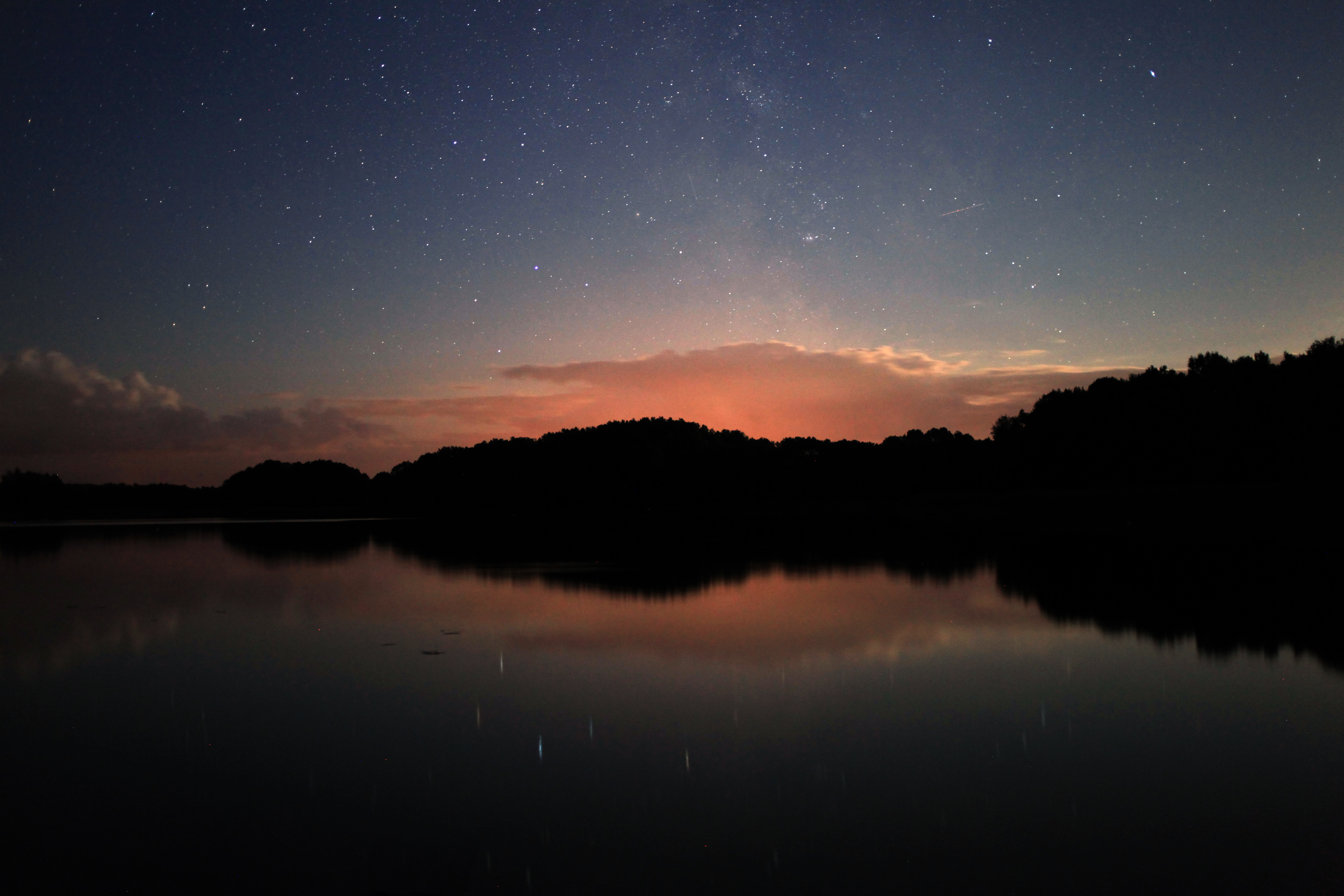

- Location within Poland
- Coordinates: 51°55′39″N 19°8′39″E
- Country: Poland
- Voivodeship: Łódź
- County: Zgierz
- Gmina: Parzęczew
- Population: 100

Skórka [ˈskurka] is a village in the administrative district of Gmina Parzęczew, within Zgierz County, Łódź Voivodeship, in central Poland.

In 2005 the village had a population of 100.
