= Timeline of Aleksandrów Łódzki =

The following is a timeline of the history of the town of Aleksandrów Łódzki, Poland.

== Prior to 19th century ==
- c. 6500 B.C. – Oldest traces of humans - settlement of ancient hunters on dunes near the Rąbień reserve.
- 11th-12th century – First villages founded in the current area of Aleksandrów Łódzki commune: Rąbień, Bełdów, Brużyca Wielka, Prawęcice and Zgniłe Błoto.
- 14th-15th century - More villages and Church of All Saints in Bełdów founded.
- 1782 – First German settlers arrived in Brużyca Wielka, many colonies founded.
- 1793 – Territory annexed by Prussia in the Second Partition of Poland.

== 19th century ==
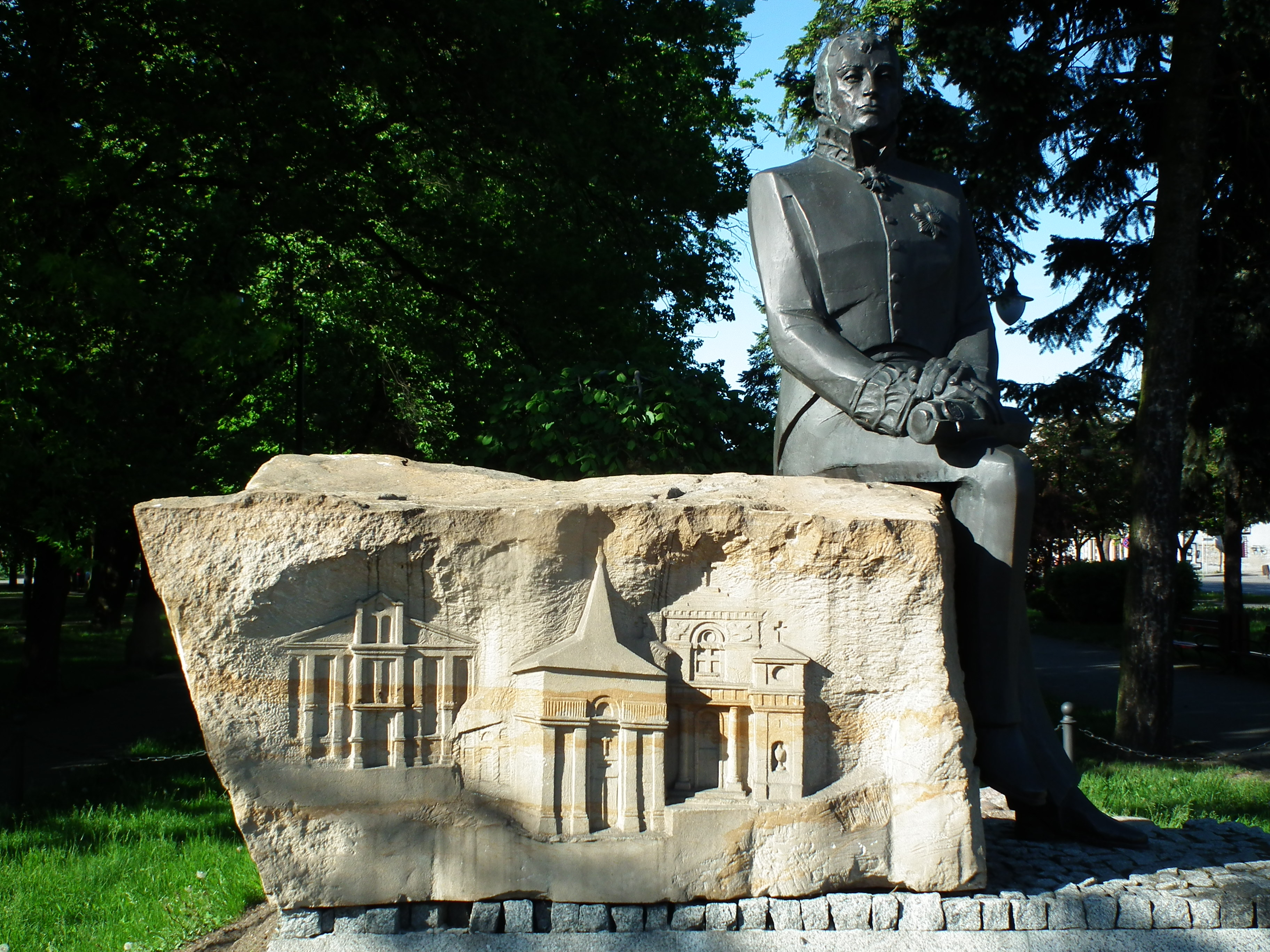
Monument of Rafał Bratoszewski, founder of the town

- 1807 – Territory included within the Duchy of Warsaw.
- 1815 – Territory included within so-called Congress Poland under Russian rule.
- c. 1816 – Owner of Brużyca Wielka – Polish nobleman Rafał Bratoszewski of Sulima coat of arms founded a new town settlement on a sandy and forestry hill – this was the future Aleksandrów. A rectangular marketplace was made along with few streets. Squire Bratoszewski founded the catholic parish of St. Rafael and Michael.
- 22 March 1822 – New settlement gained city rights and was named Aleksandrów in the name of then-ruling tzar of Russia and king of Poland – Alexander I of Russia. Aleksandrów had then 3,086 citizens, the majority of them were weavers.
- 1824 - Neo-classical town hall built during the mayor Gedeon Goedel's term.
- 6 December 1824 - Founder of Aleksandrów Rafał Bratoszewski died and was buried in the local church. Aleksandrów became the property of the Kossowski family of Dołęga coat of arms.
- 1825 – The city as an example of perfect weaving center was visited by the tzar of Russia and king of Poland Alexander I of Russia.
- 1828 - A huge evangelic church built, Fryderyk Jerzy Tuve became the first pastor.
- 1830–1831 – Citizens along with Gedeon Goedel supported the November Uprising by sending uniforms, a squad and a doctor to Warsaw.
- 25 October 1833 - Izrael Poznański was born in Aleksandrów.
- 1858-1860 - A new road leading to Łódź via the new suburbs Bałuty built.
- 1863-1864 - January Uprising – few citizens took part in fighting and the city was taken twice by the uprising soldiers.
- 1866 - Chanoch Henich ha-Kohen Lewin settled in Aleksandrów. Since then the town has become a major Jewish religious centre.
- 1869 - Aleksandrów lost its city rights.
- 1888 - The first mechanical stocking factory built by Roman Paschke.

== 20th century ==
- 1903 - Voluntary Fire Brigade and "Lutnia" singer association formed.
- 1905 - Strikes of workers and teachers against Russification.
- 1910 - An electric tram line connected Aleksandrów with Łódź.
- 11 November 1918 - A group of firefighters disarmed a German military outpost. The beginnings of independence of Poland.
- 1924 - Aleksandrów regained city rights and it is now called Łódzki.
- 1927 - A new school opened at Bankowa street.

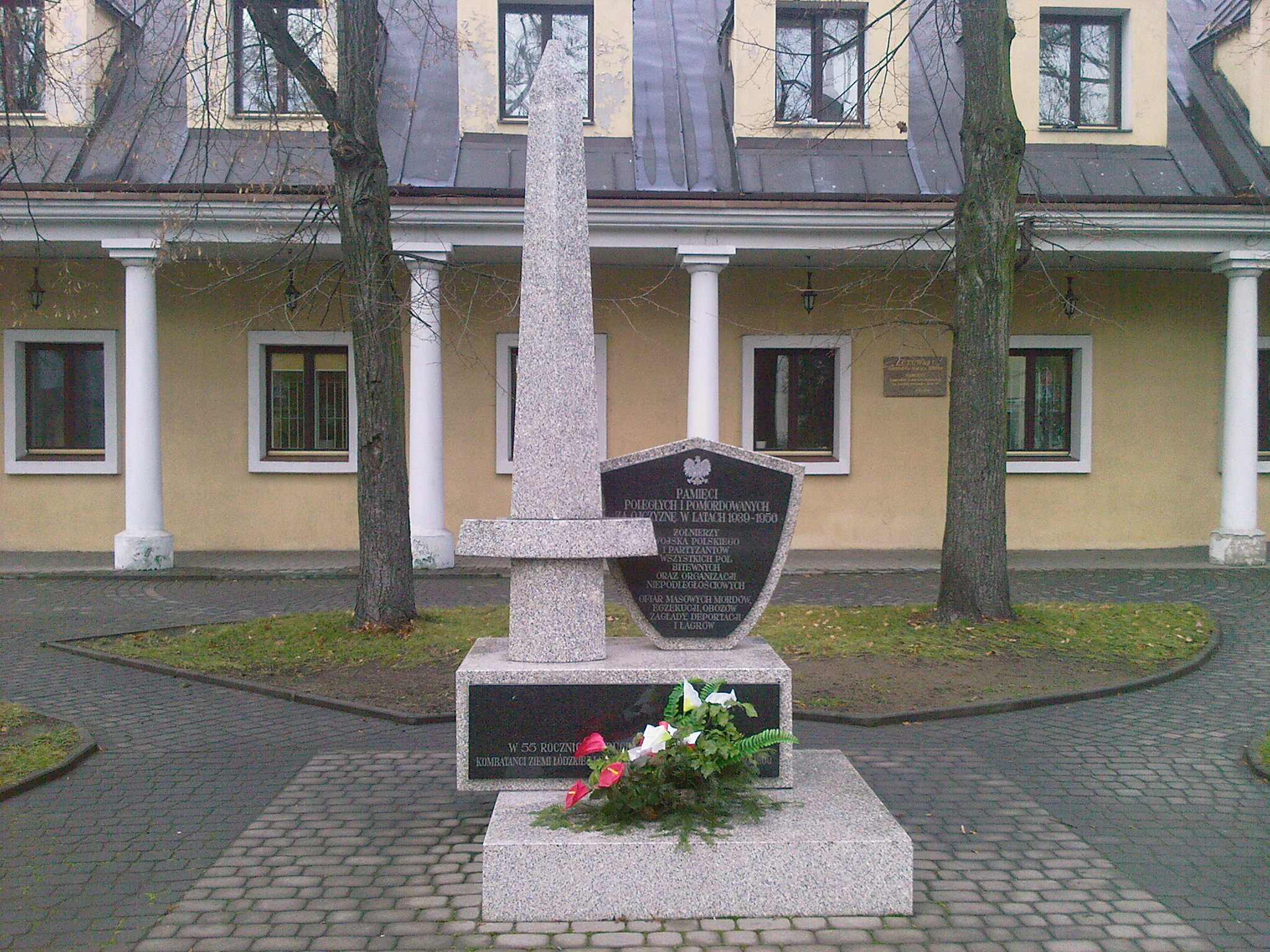
World War II memorial

- 1939
  - 7 September: German troops entered the town at the start of World War II. Beginning of German occupation.
  - 14 September: 5 Poles and 26 Jews executed by German soldiers.
  - 9 November: Aleksandrów annexed to Nazi Germany. The synagogue along with monuments of Tadeusz Kościuszko and Józef Piłsudski destroyed, Polish and Jewish schools closed.
  - 27 December: Jews deported to General Government where most of them died in German concentration camps.
- 1943 - Aleksandrów renamed to Wirkheim (home of the weavers).
- 1945
  - 17 January: Aleksandrów liberated by Soviet tank squads.
  - 24 January: Józef Janiak became the first post-war mayor of Aleksandrów.
  - 16 February: The first high school opened - State Coeducational Gymnasium. Currently the Mikołaj Kopernik High School.
- 1945-1947 - Germans forcibly moved to Germany in accordance with the Potsdam Agreement. For the first time in its history Aleksandrów became a solely Polish town.
- 1951-1953 - Airport built.
- 1959 - Primary school no. 4 opened.
- 1970s and 1980s - Bratoszewskiego, Sikorskiego and Słoneczne estates built in eastern parts of the city.
- 1974 - A youth community center opened.
- 1979 - Friends of Aleksandrów Association founded.
- 1983 - The first Days of Aleksandrów held.
- 27 May 1990 - The first free elections to the city council won by Aleksandrowska Akcja Społeczna. Krzysztof Czajkowski became the mayor.
- 8 December 1991 - A local newspaper "Czterdzieści i cztery" issues its first edition.
- 1991-1995 - The tram connection to Łódź discontinued. Currently, the cities are connected by bus line no. 78.
- 1998 Sokół Aleksandrów Łódzki football club founded.
- 1999 - Aleksandrów Association of Entrepreneurs 2000 founded.
- 27 October 2000 - Local elections won by the Platforma Obywatelska. Jacek Lipiński became the mayor.

== 21st century ==
- 2006 - Elections won again by the Platforma Obywatelska. Jacek Lipiński elected for his second term.
