= Kobiałka =

Kobiałka may refer to the following places in Poland:

- Kobiałka, Legnica County in Gmina Chojnów, Legnica County in Lower Silesian Voivodeship, Poland
- Kobiałka, Warsaw, a neighborhood in Białołęka in the north-eastern part of Warsaw
- Kobiałka, Milicz, part of the town Milicz, in the northern part of Lower Silesian Voivodeship, Poland
- Kobiałka, Łódź Voivodeship, part of the village of Stare Krasnodęby in Gmina Aleksandrów Łódzki in Zgierz County, Łódź Voivodeship,

== See also ==
- Kobiałki, a village in Gmina Wieczfnia Kościelna, Mława County, Masovian Voivodeship, in east-central Poland
