= Ruda-Bugaj =

Ruda Bugaj
- Village
- Location within Poland
- Coordinates: 51°50′26″N 19°16′16″E
- Country: Poland
- Voivodeship: Łódź
- County: Zgierz
- Gmina: Aleksandrów Łódzki
- Population: 260

Ruda Bugaj [ˈruda ˈbuɡai̯] is a village in the administrative district of Gmina Aleksandrów Łódzki, within Zgierz County, Łódź Voivodeship, in central Poland.
