= Antoniew =

Antoniew may refer to the following places:

- Antoniew, Kutno County in Łódź Voivodeship (central Poland)
- Antoniew, Pabianice County in Łódź Voivodeship (central Poland)
- Antoniew, Gmina Aleksandrów Łódzki in Łódź Voivodeship (central Poland)
- Antoniew, Gmina Głowno in Łódź Voivodeship (central Poland)
- Antoniew, Sochaczew County in Masovian Voivodeship (east-central Poland)
- Antoniew, Gmina Sochaczew in Masovian Voivodeship (east-central Poland)
- Antoniew, Żyrardów County in Masovian Voivodeship (east-central Poland)

== See also ==
- Antoniewo (disambiguation)
