= Księstwo =

Księstwo may refer to:

- A Polish duchy
- Księstwo, Łódź Voivodeship (central Poland)
- Księstwo, Masovian Voivodeship (east-central Poland)
