= Jan Malek =

Polish chess grandmaster (born 2007)

Personal information
- Born: 16 November 2007 (age 18)

Chess career
- Country: Poland
- Title: Grandmaster (2025)
- FIDE rating: 2598 (November 2026)
- Peak rating: 2598 (November 2026)

Jan Malek (born 16 November 2007) is a Polish chess grandmaster (2025).

== Chess career ==
Jan Malek has won medals at the Polish Youth Chess Championships three times: gold in Sypniewo in 2022 (U16 age group), silver in Jastrzębia Góra in 2023 (U16 age group), gold in Stare Jabłonki in 2024 (U18 age group)

Jan Malek has won Polish Youth Rapid Chess Championship in Wrocław in 2014 (U14 age group). He has also won Polish Youth Blitz Chess Championship in Rzeszów in 2022 (U16 age group). He represented Poland at European Youth Chess Championships (3 times), achieving his best result in 2023 in Mamaja (5th place at the U14 age group). He won bronze medal with Poland team in European Youth Chess Team Championship in the U18 age group.

In 2023, he participated at the Polish Chess Championship.

Jan Malek has been among the winners in the following tournaments:

- 2020 – 2nd place in Warsaw Chess Championship;
- 2021 – shared 2nd place in Jastrzębie Górne Chess Tournament Gwiazda Północy;
- 2023/2024 – 2nd place with chess club Moravská Slavia in Czech Extraliga;
- 2024 – shared 2nd place in Przeworsku in Round Robin Tournament (GM norm), shared 2nd place in Białystok (Ludwik Zamenhof Memorial, open A).

In 2024, he was awarded the FIDE International Master (IM) title and received the FIDE Grandmaster (GM) title year later.
