= Krzywiec =

Krzywiec may refer to the following places:

- Krzywiec, Łódź Voivodeship (central Poland)
- Krzywiec, Podlaskie Voivodeship (north-east Poland)
- Krzywiec, Braniewo County in Warmian-Masurian Voivodeship (north Poland)
- Krzywiec, Iława County in Warmian-Masurian Voivodeship (north Poland)
- Krzywiec, West Pomeranian Voivodeship (north-west Poland)
- Krzywiec, the former Polish name for the town Kryvets (Кривець) in Bohorodchany Raion, Ivano-Frankivsk Oblast, Ukraine
