= Nowy Adamów =

- Village
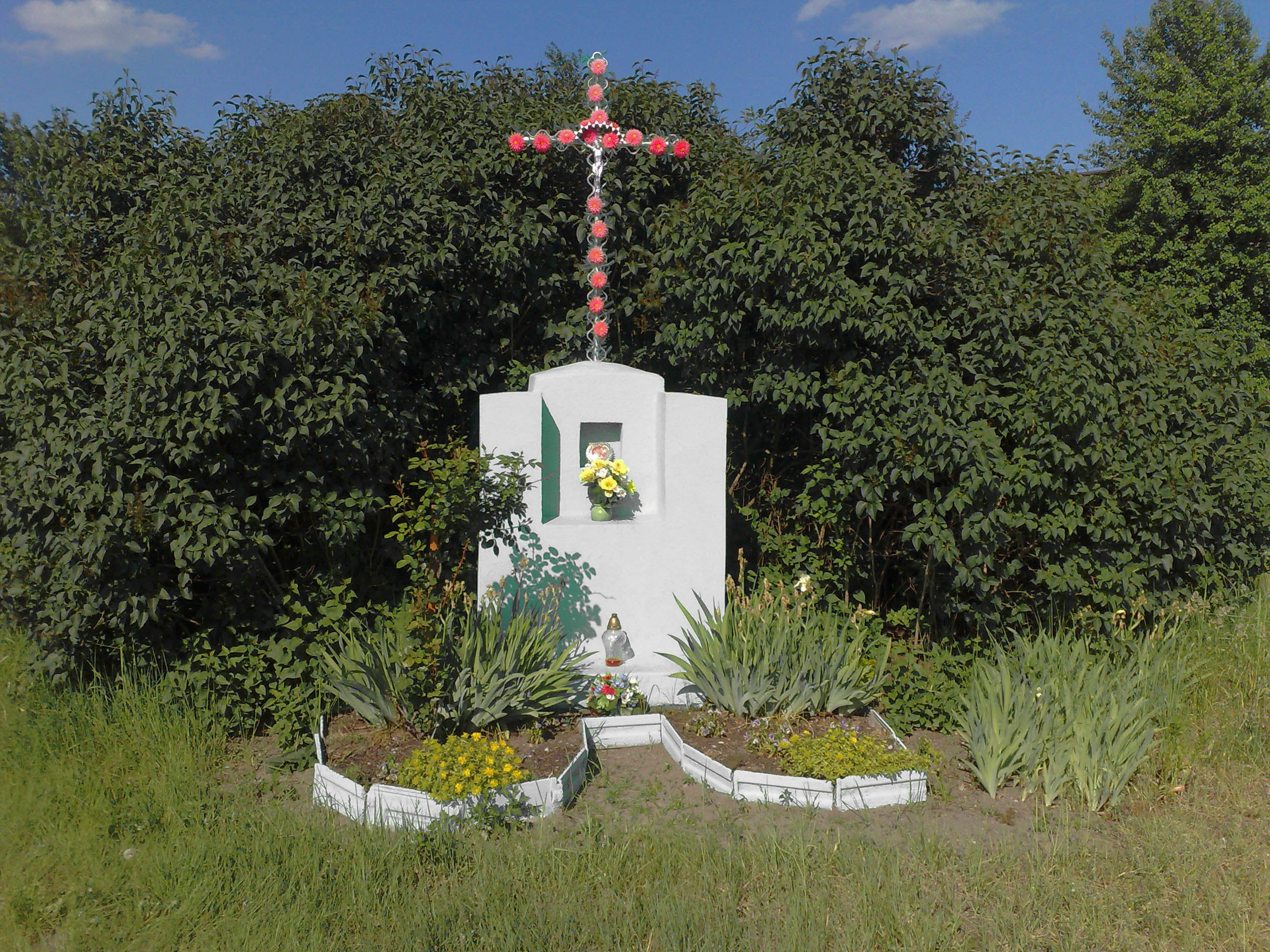

- Location within Poland
- Coordinates: 51°49′42″N 19°14′20″E
- Country: Poland
- Voivodeship: Łódź
- County: Zgierz
- Gmina: Aleksandrów Łódzki
- Population: 140

Nowy Adamów [ˈnɔvɨ aˈdamuf] is a village in the administrative district of Gmina Aleksandrów Łódzki, within Zgierz County, Łódź Voivodeship, in central Poland.
