= Sanie, Łódź Voivodeship =

Sanie
- Village
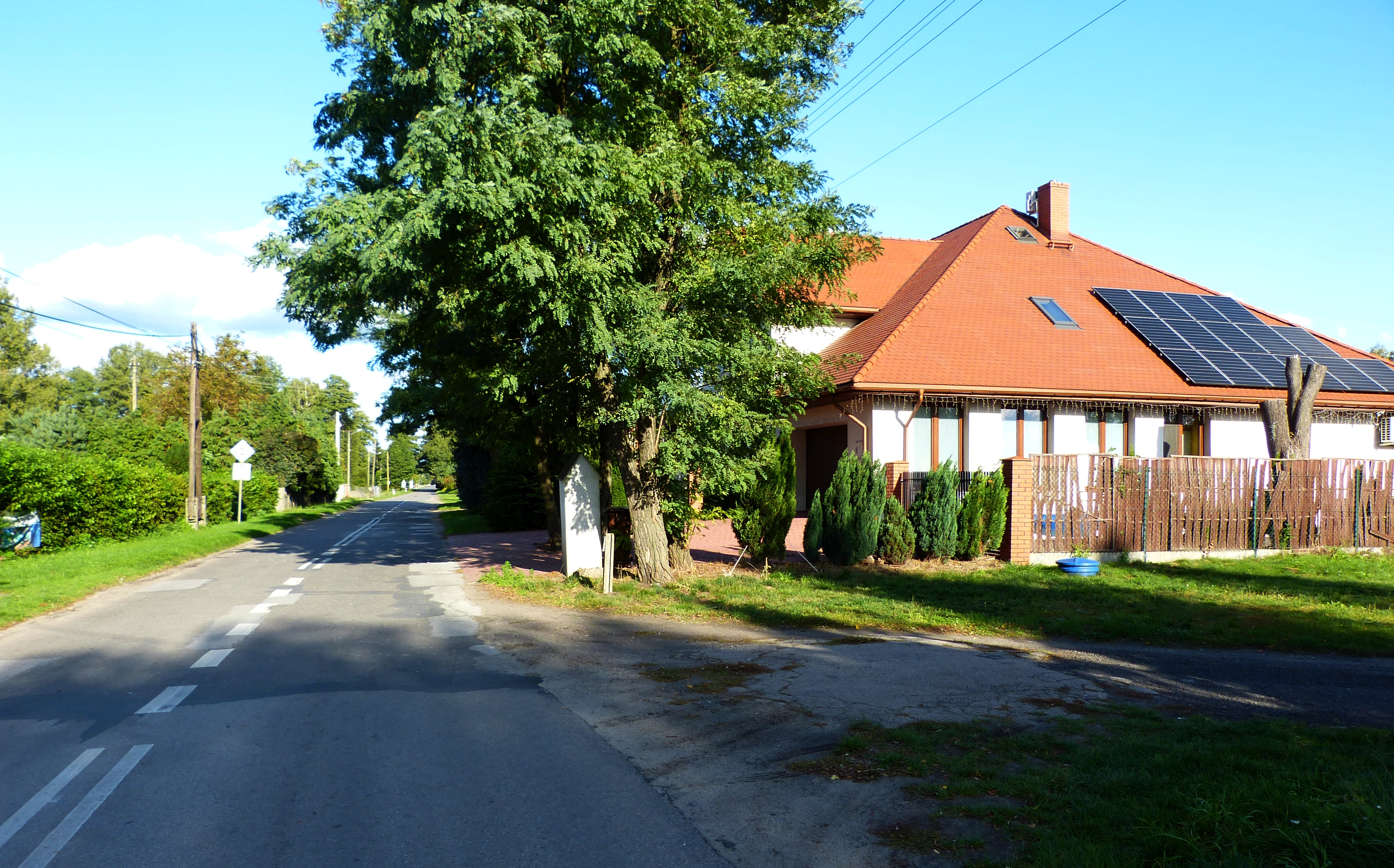

- Location within Poland
- Coordinates: 51°48′57″N 19°14′26″E
- Country: Poland
- Voivodeship: Łódź
- County: Zgierz
- Gmina: Aleksandrów Łódzki
- Population: 190

Sanie [ˈsaɲɛ] is a village in the administrative district of Gmina Aleksandrów Łódzki, within Zgierz County, Łódź Voivodeship, in central Poland.
