= Łobódź =

- Village
- Location within Poland
- Coordinates: 51°49′40″N 19°15′36″E
- Country: Poland
- Voivodeship: Łódź
- County: Zgierz
- Gmina: Aleksandrów Łódzki

Łobódź [ˈwɔbut͡ɕ] is a village in the administrative district of Gmina Aleksandrów Łódzki, within Zgierz County, Łódź Voivodeship, in central Poland.
