= Kolonia Brużyca =

- Village
- Location within Poland
- Coordinates: 51°49′58″N 19°20′21″E
- Country: Poland
- Voivodeship: Łódź
- County: Zgierz
- Gmina: Aleksandrów Łódzki
- Population: 60

Kolonia Brużyca [kɔˈlɔɲa bruˈʐɨt͡sa] is a village in the administrative district of Gmina Aleksandrów Łódzki, within Zgierz County, Łódź Voivodeship, in central Poland.
