= Rąbień AB =

- Village
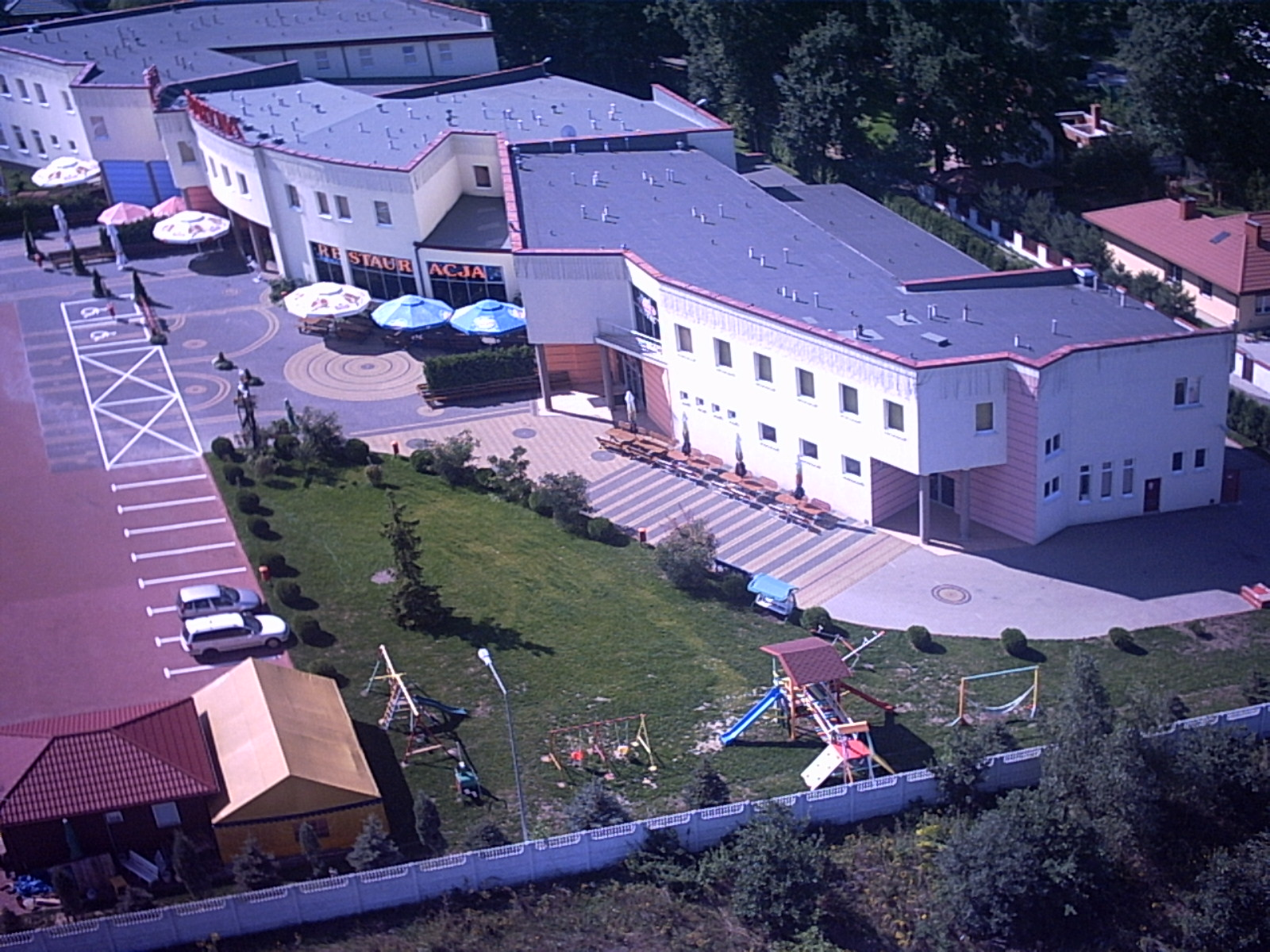

- Location within Poland
- Coordinates: 51°47′14″N 19°17′56″E
- Country: Poland
- Voivodeship: Łódź
- County: Zgierz
- Gmina: Aleksandrów Łódzki
- Population: 600

Rąbień AB is a village in the administrative district of Gmina Aleksandrów Łódzki, within Zgierz County, Łódź Voivodeship, in central Poland.
