= Bełdów-Krzywa Wieś =

- Village
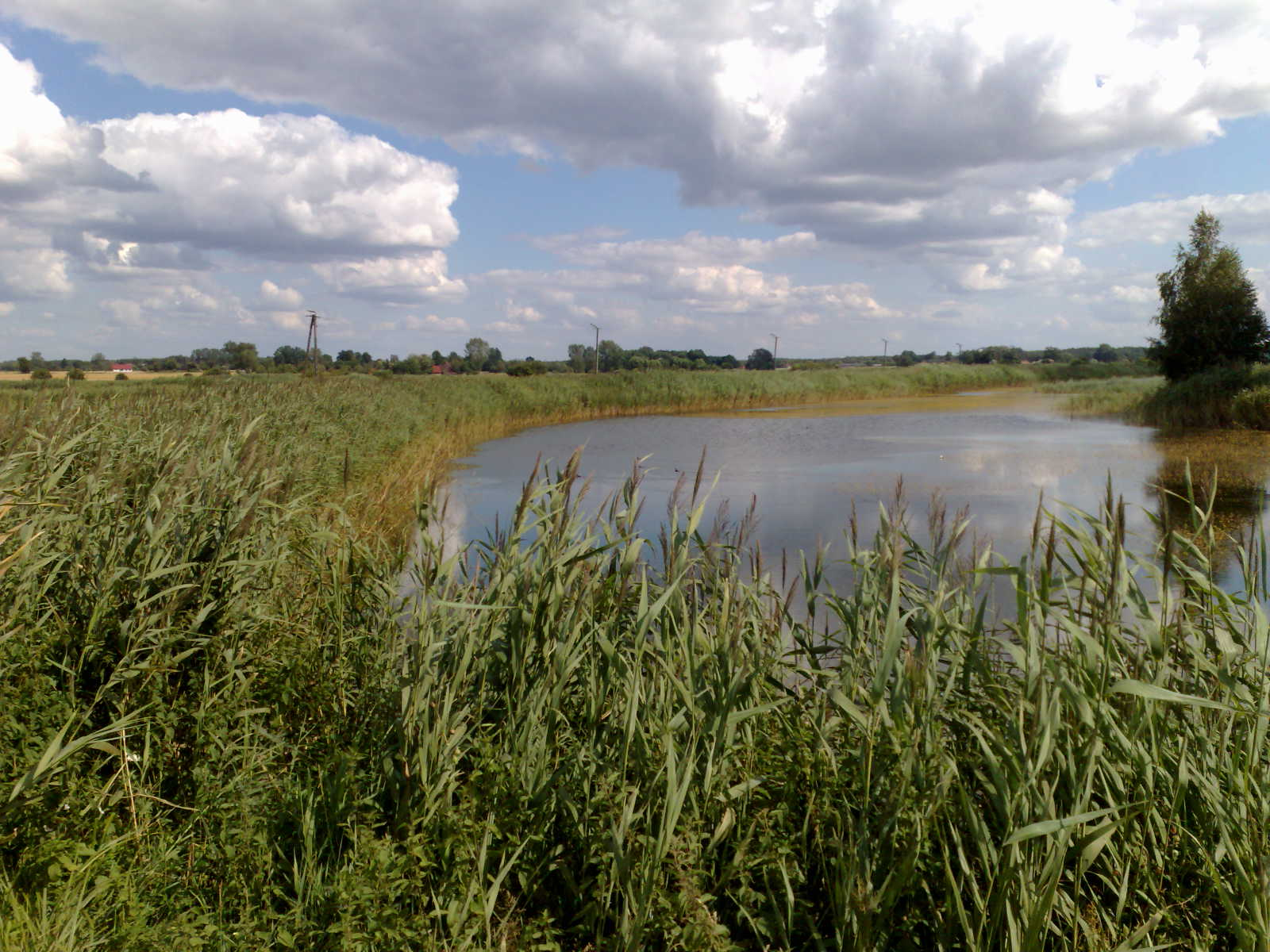

- Location within Poland
- Coordinates: 51°50′16″N 19°10′55″E
- Country: Poland
- Voivodeship: Łódź
- County: Zgierz
- Gmina: Aleksandrów Łódzki

Bełdów-Krzywa Wieś [ˈbɛu̯duf ˈkʂɨva ˈvʲɛɕ] is a village in the administrative district of Gmina Aleksandrów Łódzki, within Zgierz County, Łódź Voivodeship, in central Poland.
