= Grunwald, Łódź Voivodeship =

Grunwald
- Village
- Location within Poland
- Coordinates: 51°47′57″N 19°16′14″E
- Country: Poland
- Voivodeship: Łódź
- County: Zgierz
- Gmina: Aleksandrów Łódzki
- Population: 60

Grunwald [ˈɡrunvalt] is a village in the administrative district of Gmina Aleksandrów Łódzki, within Zgierz County, Łódź Voivodeship, in central Poland.
