= Nakielnica =

- Village
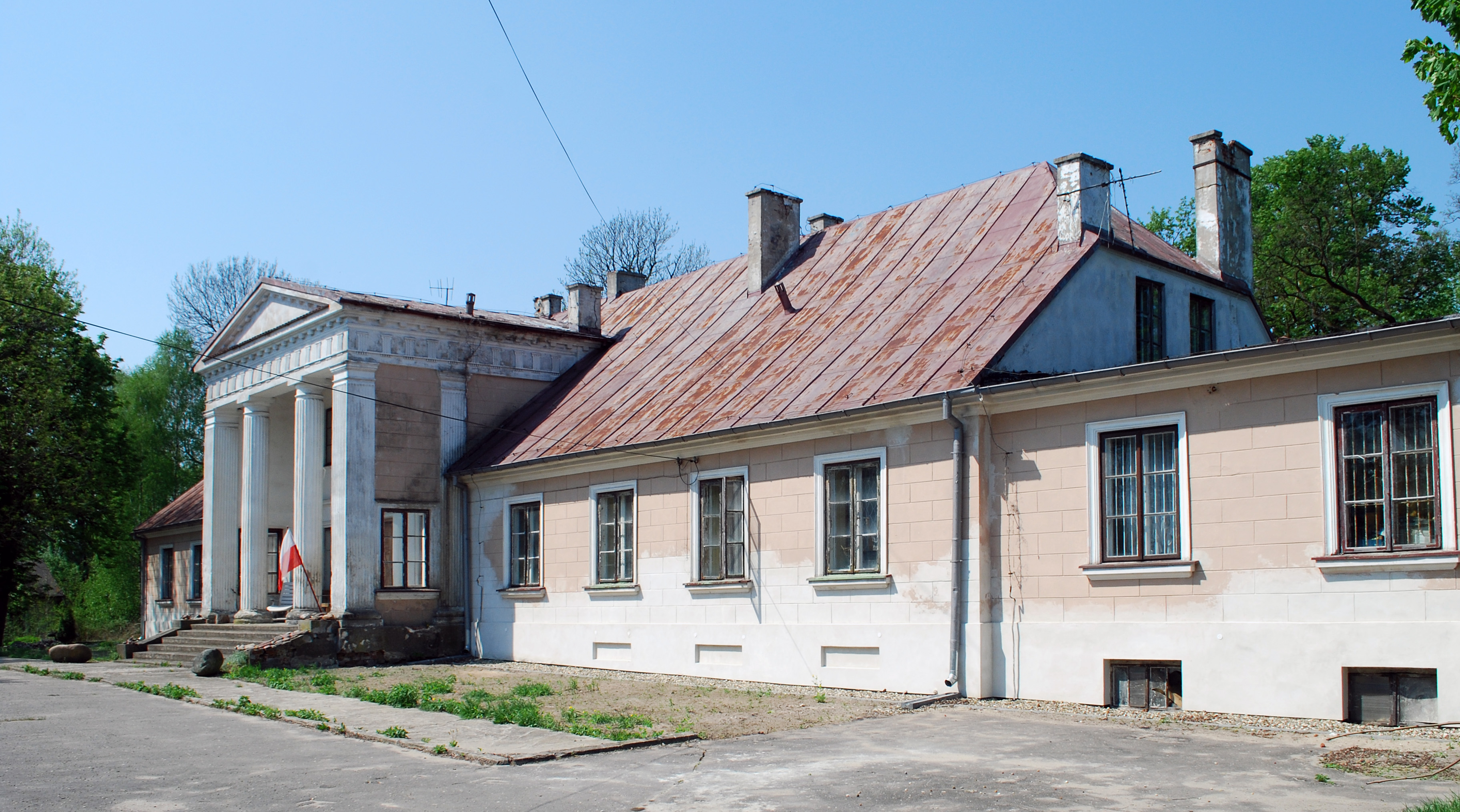
- Manor

- Location within Poland
- Coordinates: 51°51′21″N 19°15′46″E
- Country: Poland
- Voivodeship: Łódź
- County: Zgierz
- Gmina: Aleksandrów Łódzki
- Population: 260

Nakielnica [nakʲɛlˈɲit͡sa] is a village in the administrative district of Gmina Aleksandrów Łódzki, within Zgierz County, Łódź Voivodeship, in central Poland.
