= Brużyczka Mała =

- Village
- Location within Poland
- Coordinates: 51°51′N 19°20′E
- Country: Poland
- Voivodeship: Łódź
- County: Zgierz
- Gmina: Aleksandrów Łódzki

Brużyczka Mała [bruˈʐɨt͡ʂka ˈmawa] is a village in the administrative district of Gmina Aleksandrów Łódzki, within Zgierz County, Łódź Voivodeship, in central Poland.
