= Wola Grzymkowa =

- Village
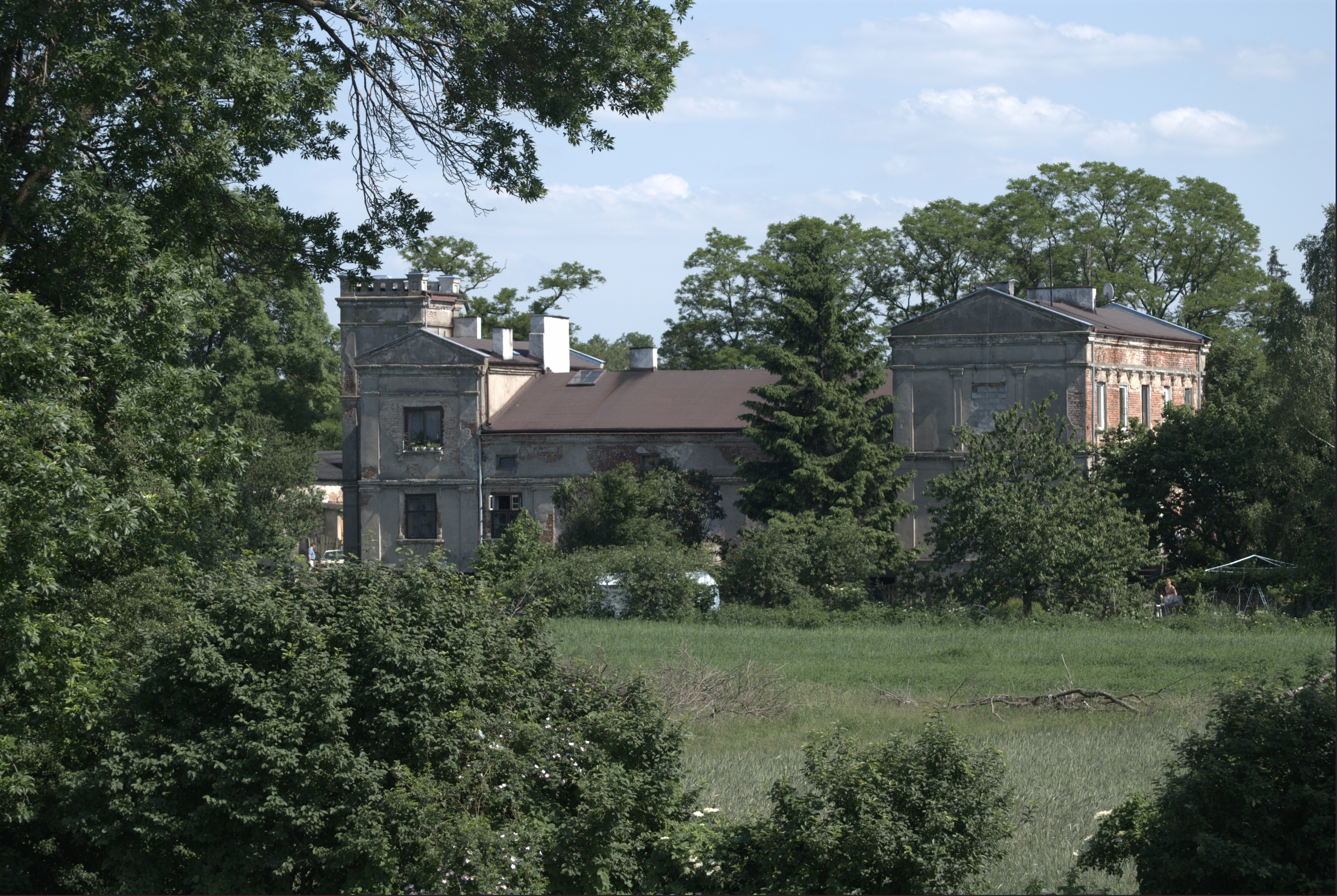

- Location within Poland
- Coordinates: 51°48′N 19°17′E
- Country: Poland
- Voivodeship: Łódź
- County: Zgierz
- Gmina: Aleksandrów Łódzki

Wola Grzymkowa [ˈvɔla ɡʐɨmˈkɔva] is a village in the administrative district of Gmina Aleksandrów Łódzki, within Zgierz County, Łódź Voivodeship, in central Poland.
