= Izabelin, Zgierz County =

Izabelin
- Village
- Location within Poland
- Coordinates: 51°47′48″N 19°15′47″E
- Country: Poland
- Voivodeship: Łódź
- County: Zgierz
- Gmina: Aleksandrów Łódzki
- Population: 40

Izabelin [izaˈbɛlʲin] is a village in the administrative district of Gmina Aleksandrów Łódzki, within Zgierz County, Łódź Voivodeship, in central Poland.
