= Budy Wolskie, Łódź Voivodeship =

Budy Wolskie
- Village
- Location within Poland
- Coordinates: 51°47′53″N 19°14′35″E
- Country: Poland
- Voivodeship: Łódź
- County: Zgierz
- Gmina: Aleksandrów Łódzki
- Population: 40

Budy Wolskie [ˈbudɨ ˈvɔlskʲɛ] is a village in the administrative district of Gmina Aleksandrów Łódzki, within Zgierz County, Łódź Voivodeship, in central Poland.
