= Placydów =

- Village
- Location within Poland
- Coordinates: 51°48′39″N 19°16′2″E
- Country: Poland
- Voivodeship: Łódź
- County: Zgierz
- Gmina: Aleksandrów Łódzki
- Population: 50

Placydów [plaˈt͡sɨduf] is a village in the administrative district of Gmina Aleksandrów Łódzki, within Zgierz County, Łódź Voivodeship, in central Poland.
