= Ciężków =

- Village
- Location within Poland
- Coordinates: 51°50′1″N 19°12′4″E
- Country: Poland
- Voivodeship: Łódź
- County: Zgierz
- Gmina: Aleksandrów Łódzki
- Population: 120

Ciężków [ˈt͡ɕɛ̃ʂkuf] is a village in the administrative district of Gmina Aleksandrów Łódzki, within Zgierz County, Łódź Voivodeship, in central Poland.

In 2005 the village had a population of 120.
