= Antoniewo =

Antoniewo may refer to the following places:

- Antoniewo, Aleksandrów County in Kuyavian-Pomeranian Voivodeship (central Poland)
- Antoniewo, Włocławek County in Kuyavian-Pomeranian Voivodeship (central Poland)
- Antoniewo, Żnin County in Kuyavian-Pomeranian Voivodeship (north-central Poland)
- Antoniewo, Gmina Ostrów Mazowiecka in Masovian Voivodeship (east-central Poland)
- Antoniewo, Sierpc County in Masovian Voivodeship (north-central Poland)
- Antoniewo, Żuromin County in Masovian Voivodeship (north-central Poland)
- Antoniewo, Greater Poland Voivodeship (west-central Poland)
- Antoniewo, Pomeranian Voivodeship (north Poland)
- Antoniewo, Warmian-Masurian Voivodeship (north Poland)

== See also ==
- Antoniew (disambiguation)
