= Sobień, Zgierz County =

Sobień
- Village
- Location within Poland
- Coordinates: 51°51′52″N 19°11′34″E
- Country: Poland
- Voivodeship: Łódź
- County: Zgierz
- Gmina: Aleksandrów Łódzki
- Population: 210

Sobień [ˈsɔbʲɛɲ] is a village in the administrative district of Gmina Aleksandrów Łódzki, within Zgierz County, Łódź Voivodeship, in central Poland.
