= Stare Krasnodęby =

- Village
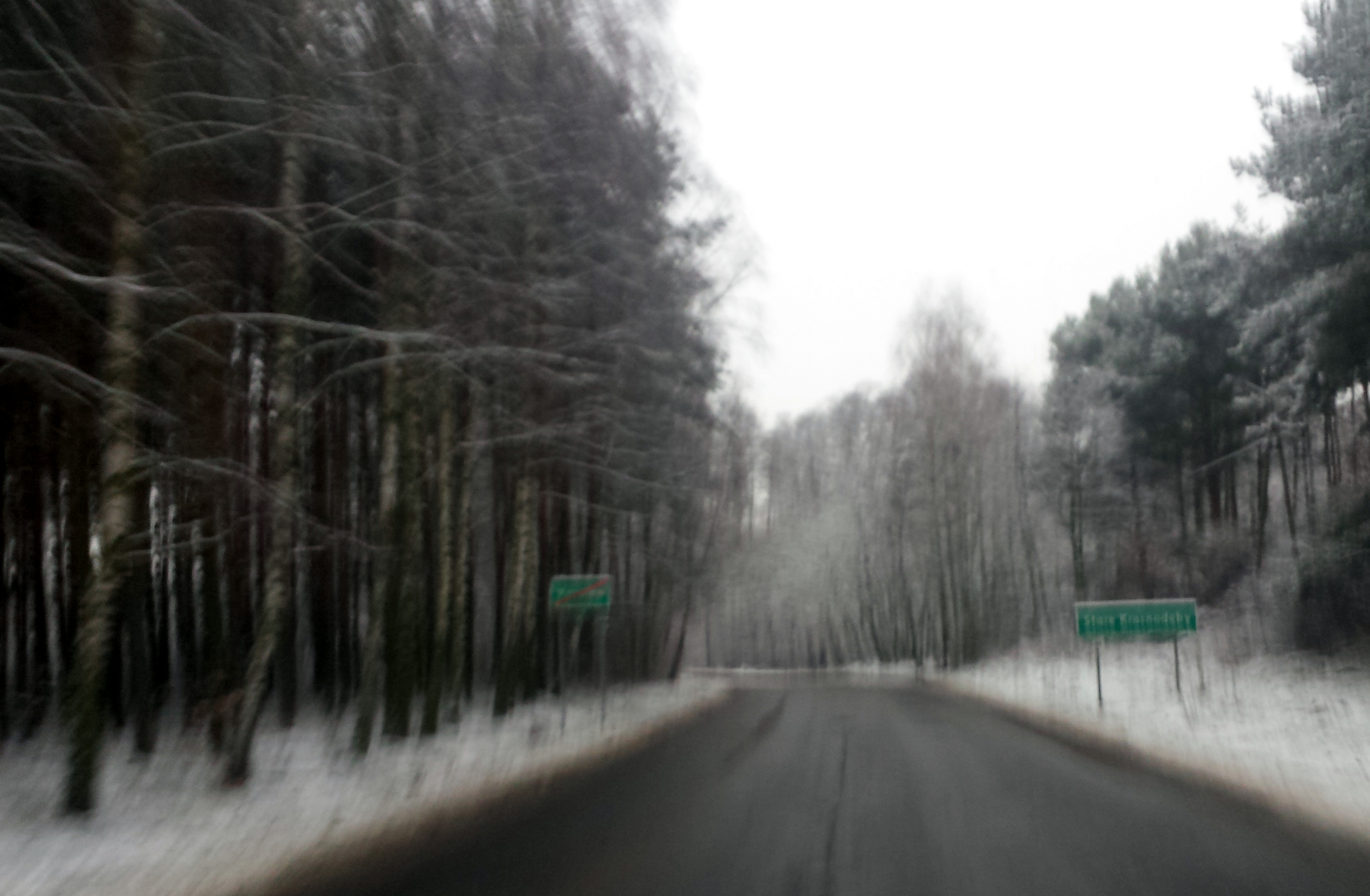
- Southern route to Stare Krasnodęby

- Location within Poland
- Coordinates: 51°52′33″N 19°13′0″E
- Country: Poland
- Voivodeship: Łódź
- County: Zgierz
- Gmina: Aleksandrów Łódzki
- Population: 70

Stare Krasnodęby [ˈstarɛ krasnɔˈdɛmbɨ] is a village in the administrative district of Gmina Aleksandrów Łódzki, within Zgierz County, Łódź Voivodeship, in central Poland.
