= Księstwo, Łódź Voivodeship =

Księstwo
- Village
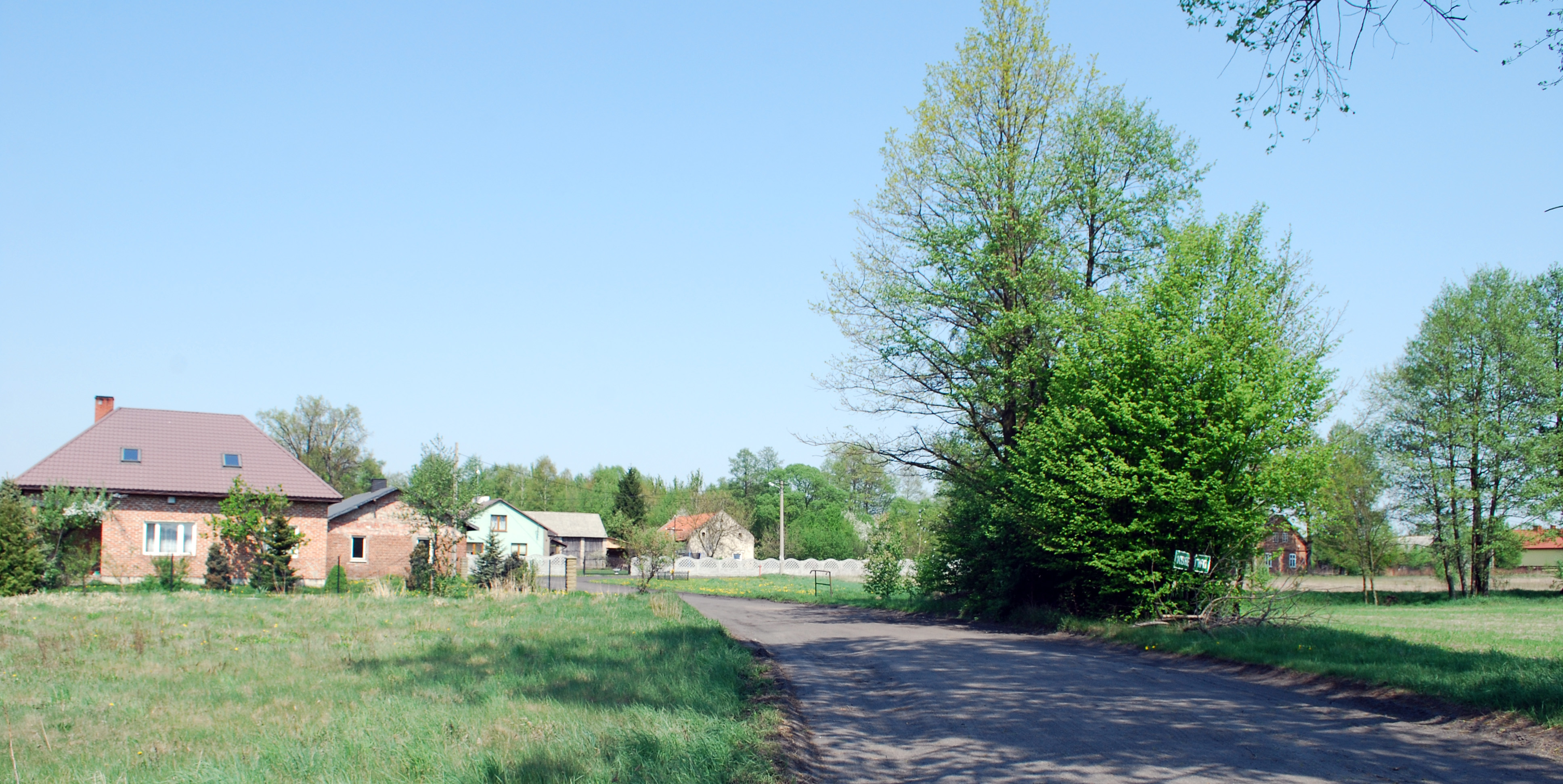

- Location within Poland
- Coordinates: 51°50′41″N 19°18′6″E
- Country: Poland
- Voivodeship: Łódź
- County: Zgierz
- Gmina: Aleksandrów Łódzki
- Population: 170

Księstwo [ˈkɕɛ̃stfɔ] is a village in the administrative district of Gmina Aleksandrów Łódzki, within Zgierz County, Łódź Voivodeship, in central Poland.
