= Gmina Aleksandrów Łódzki =

Gmina Aleksandrów Łódzki Aleksandrów Łódzki Commune
- Gmina

- Flag Coat of arms
- Interactive map of Gmina Aleksandrów Łódzki
- Coordinates (Aleksandrów Łódzki): 51°49′N 19°18′E
- Country: Poland
- Voivodeship: Łódź
- County: Zgierz
- Seat: Aleksandrów Łódzki

Area
  - Total: 213.50 km^{2} (82.43 sq mi)

Population (30.06.2016)
  - Total: 30,812
  - Density: 144.32/km^{2} (373.78/sq mi)
  - Urban: 20,512
  - Rural: 5,894
- Time zone: UTC+1 (CET)
  - Summer (DST): UTC+2 (CEST)
- Website: www.aleksandrow-lodzki.pl

Gmina Aleksandrów Łódzki is an urban-rural gmina (administrative district) in Zgierz County, Łódź Voivodeship, in central Poland. Its seat is the town of Aleksandrów Łódzki, which lies approximately 9 kilometres (6 mi) south-west of Zgierz and 13 km (8 mi) west of the regional capital Łódź.

The gmina covers an area of 115.58 square kilometres (44.6 sq mi), and as of 2006 its total population is 26,406 (of which the population of Aleksandrów Łódzki is 21,257, and the population of the rural part of the gmina is 5,894).

== Villages ==
The gmina contains the following villages having the status of sołectwo:

- Bełdów
- Bełdów-Krzywa Wieś
- Chrośno
- Ciężków
- Jastrzębie Górne
- Kolonia Brużyca
- Krzywiec
- Księstwo
- Brużyczka Mała
- Nakielnica (sołectwo includes Karolew)
- Nowe Krasnodęby
- Adamów (consists of Nowy Adamów and Stary Adamów)
- Prawęcice
- Rąbień (includes Antoniew)
- Rąbień AB
- Ruda Bugaj (includes Łobódź)
- Sanie
- Słowak
- Sobień
- Stare Krasnodęby
- Wola Grzymkowa (includes Budy Wolskie
- Grunwald
- Izabelin
- Placydów)
- Zgniłe Błoto

== Neighbouring gminas ==
Gmina Aleksandrów Łódzki is bordered by the towns of Konstantynów Łódzki, Łódź and Zgierz, and by the gminas of Dalików, Lutomiersk, Parzęczew and Zgierz.
