= Jacek Lipiński =

Polish lawyer and mayor

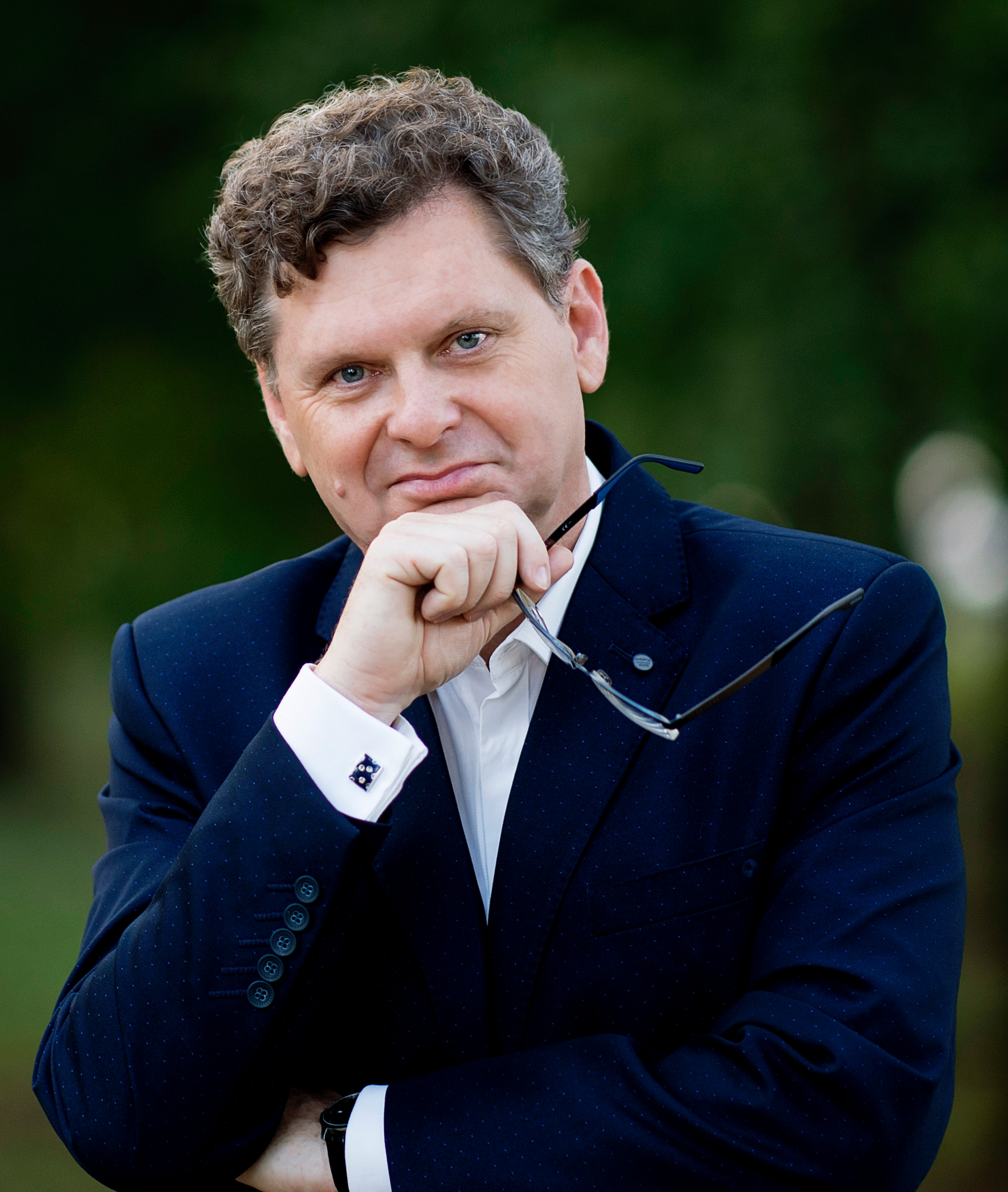
- Jacek Lipiński

Mayor of Aleksandrów Łódzki
- In office 2002–?

Personal details
- Born: 26 February 1966 (age 60) Łódź, Poland
- Party: Civic Platform

Jacek Lipiński (born 26 February 1966) is a Polish lawyer, prosecutor, and mayor of Aleksandrów Łódzki, Poland city and commune since 2002. He was elected for the second term in general elections held on 18 November 2006, gaining 60.75% of the votes.
