= Kobiałka, Warsaw =

Neighbourhood of Warsaw, Poland

Kobiałka
- Neighbourhood and Municipal Information System area
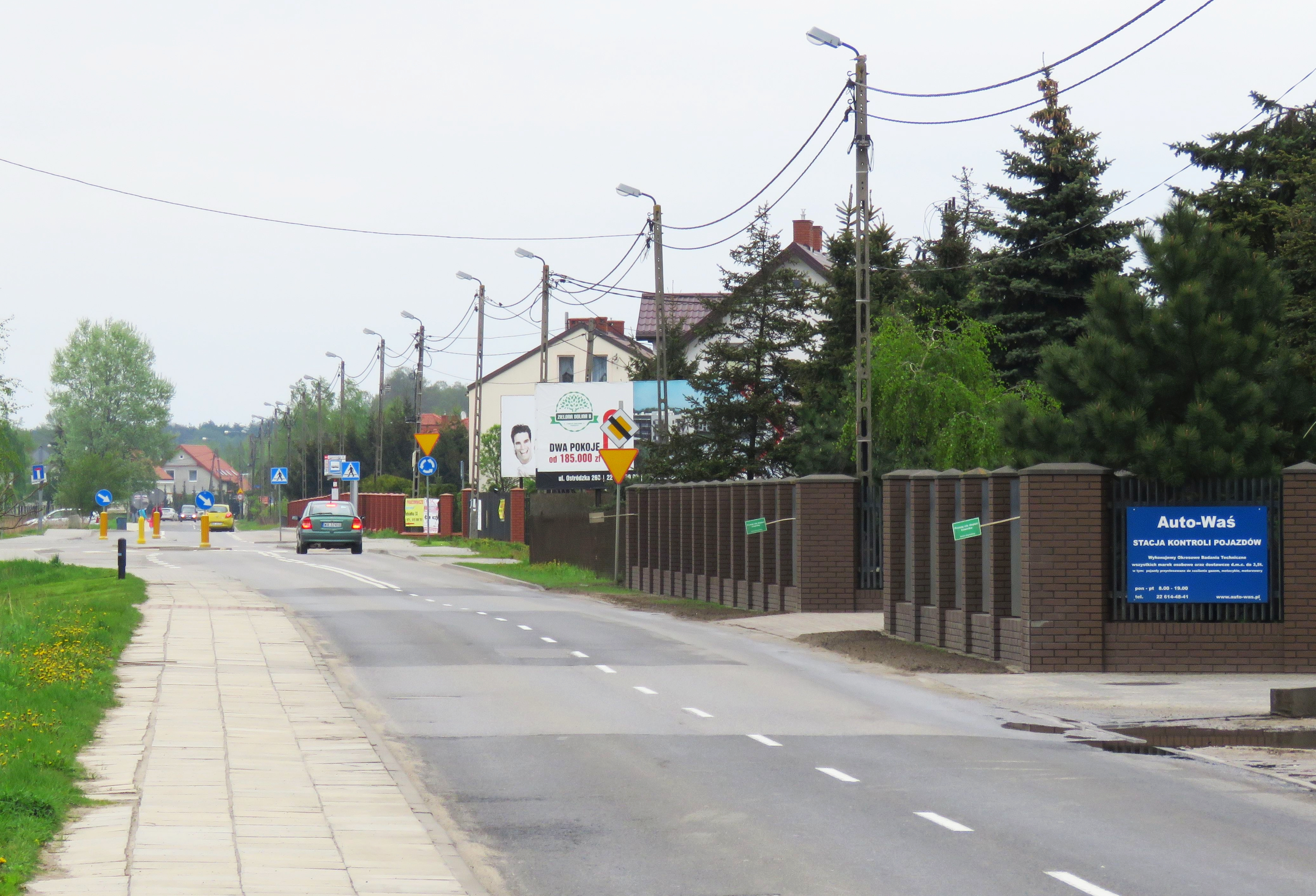
- Kobiałka Street located in the neighbourhood of Kobiałka, in 2017.

- Location of Kobiałka within the district of Białołęka, in accordance to the Municipal Information System.
- Coordinates: 52°21′21″N 21°02′18″E
- Country: Poland
- Voivodeship: Masovian Voivodeship
- City county: Warsaw
- District: Białołęka
- Time zone: UTC+1 (CET)
  - Summer (DST): UTC+2 (CEST)
- Area code: +48 22

Kobiałka is a neighbourhood, and an area of the Municipal Information System, in the city of Warsaw, Poland, located within the district of Białołęka.

== History ==
In 20th century, Kobiałka was a small village near the city of Warsaw. It was incorporated into Warsaw on 1 August 1977.
