= Antoniew, Gmina Aleksandrów Łódzki =

Antoniew
- Village
- Location within Poland
- Coordinates: 51°47′51″N 19°20′56″E
- Country: Poland
- Voivodeship: Łódź
- County: Zgierz
- Gmina: Aleksandrów Łódzki

Antoniew [anˈtɔɲɛf] is a village in the administrative district of Gmina Aleksandrów Łódzki, within Zgierz County, Łódź Voivodeship, in central Poland.
