= Jastrzębie Górne, Łódź Voivodeship =

Jastrzębie Górne
- Village
- Location within Poland
- Coordinates: 51°51′27″N 19°19′11″E
- Country: Poland
- Voivodeship: Łódź
- County: Zgierz
- Gmina: Aleksandrów Łódzki
- Population: 140

Jastrzębie Górne [jasˈtʂɛmbʲɛ ˈɡurnɛ] is a village in the administrative district of Gmina Aleksandrów Łódzki, within Zgierz County, Łódź Voivodeship, in central Poland.
