= Rąbień =

- Village
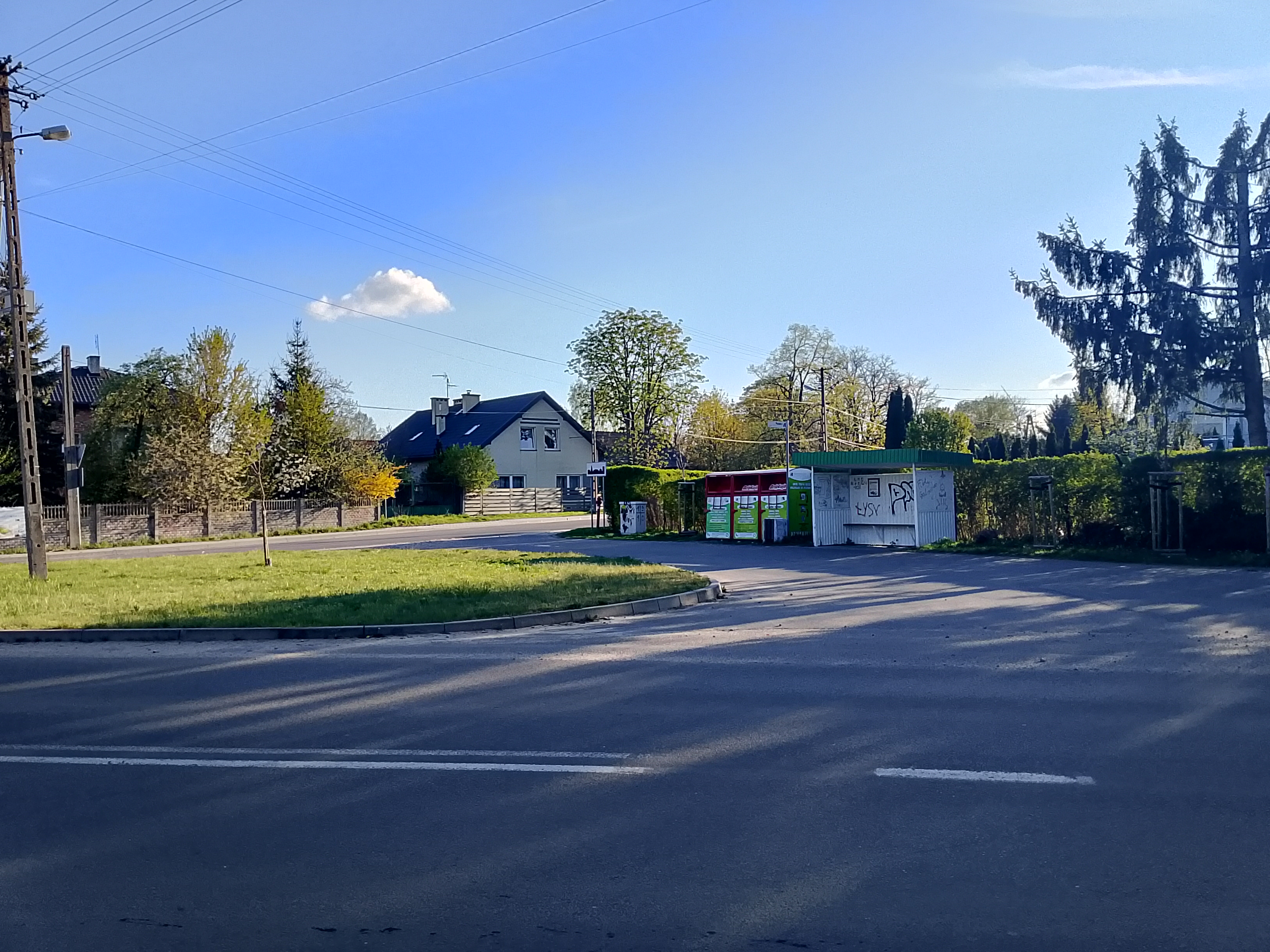

- Location within Poland
- Coordinates: 51°47′N 19°19′E
- Country: Poland
- Voivodeship: Łódź
- County: Zgierz
- Gmina: Aleksandrów Łódzki

Rąbień [ˈrɔmbʲɛɲ] is a village in the administrative district of Gmina Aleksandrów Łódzki, within Zgierz County, Łódź Voivodeship, in central Poland.
