= Zgniłe Błoto =

- Village
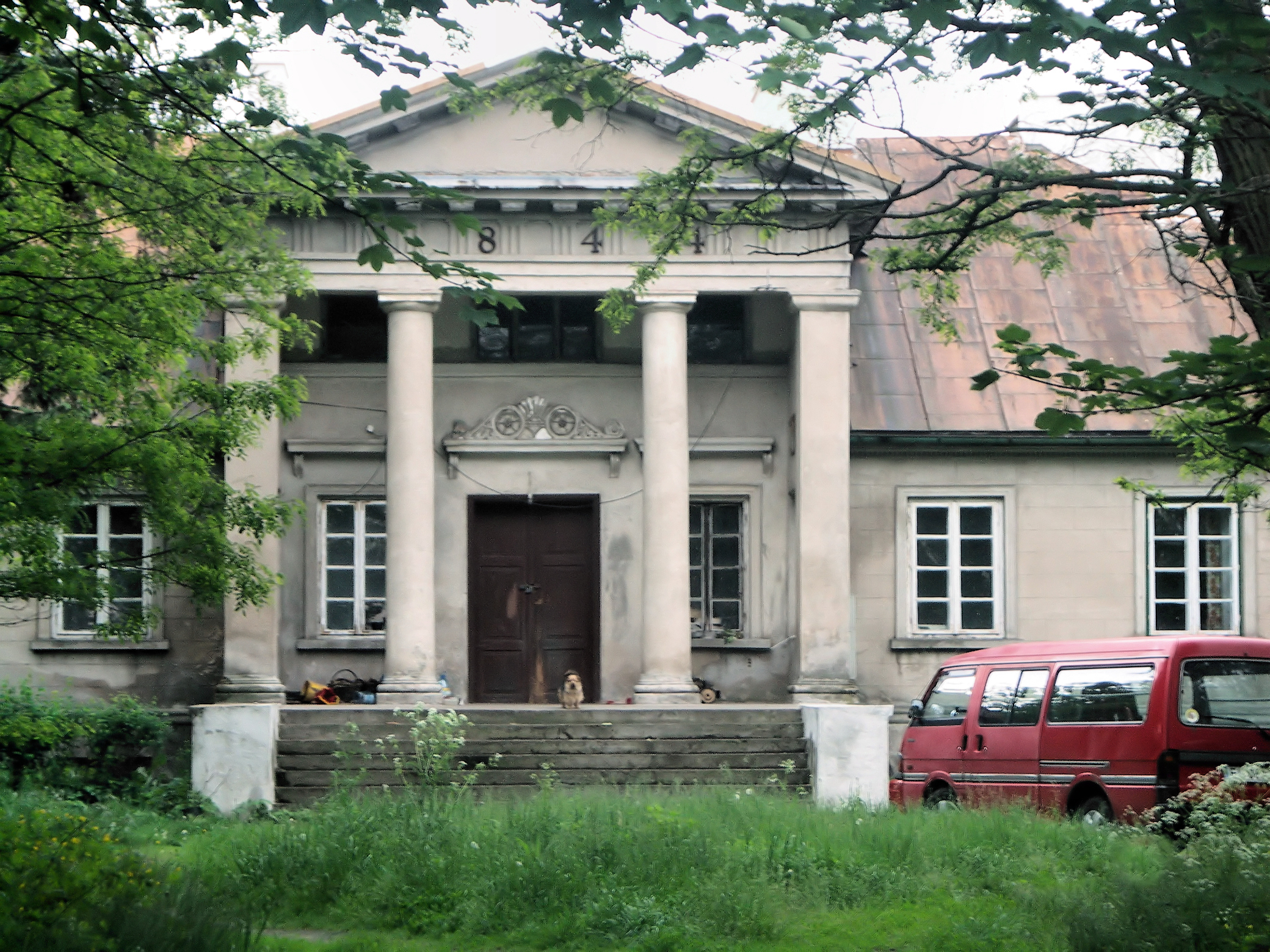
- Szlachta dwór

- Location within Poland
- Coordinates: 51°48′N 19°14′E
- Country: Poland
- Voivodeship: Łódź
- County: Zgierz
- Gmina: Aleksandrów Łódzki

Zgniłe Błoto [ˈzɡɲiwɛ ˈbwɔtɔ] is a village in the administrative district of Gmina Aleksandrów Łódzki, within Zgierz County, Łódź Voivodeship, in central Poland.
