= Aleksandrów Łódzki =

- Town
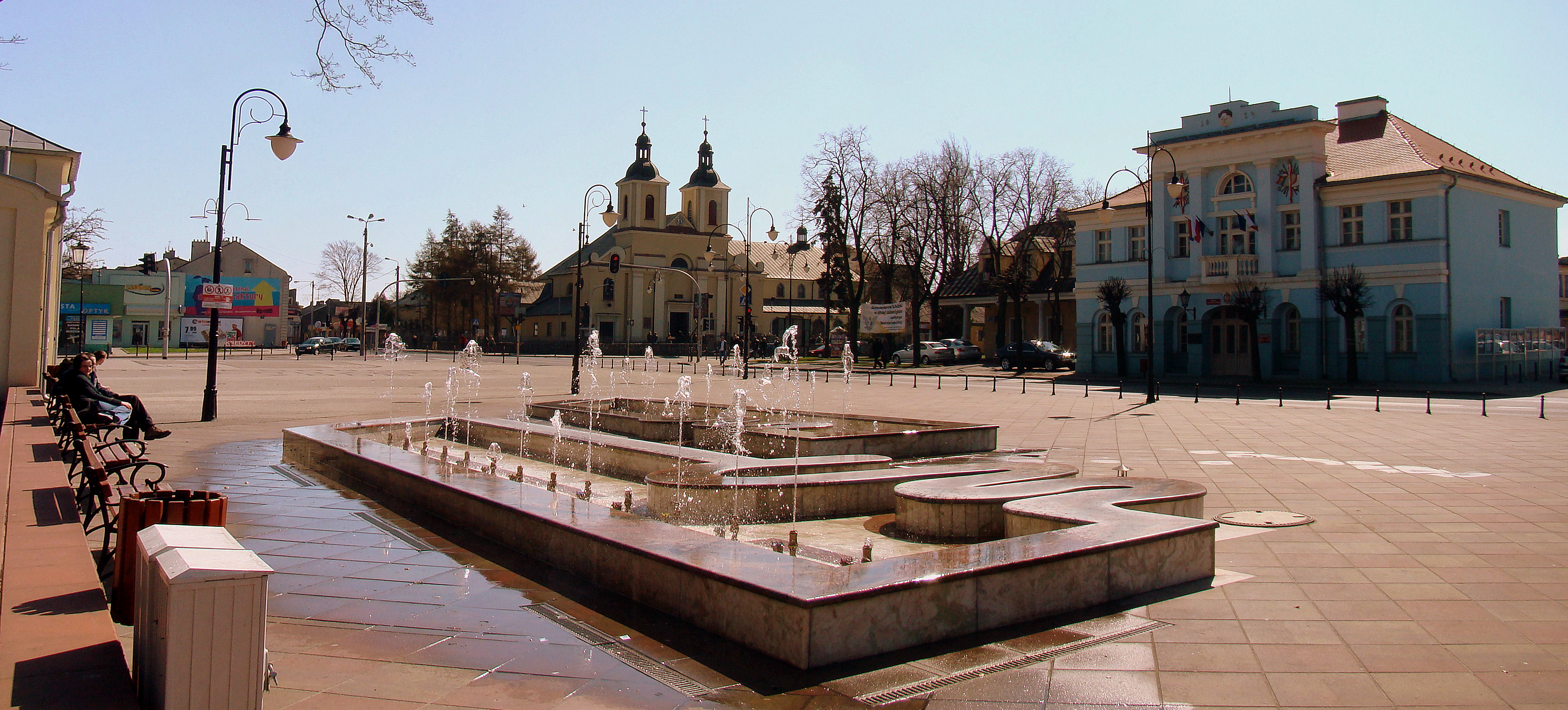
- Kościuszko Square in Aleksandrów Łódzki

- Flag Coat of arms
- Nicknames: Weavers' Town
- Location within Poland
- Coordinates: 51°49′10″N 19°18′14″E
- Country: Poland
- Voivodeship: Łódź
- County: Zgierz
- Gmina: Aleksandrów Łódzki
- Established: 19th century
- Town rights: 1822–1869, 1924
- Founder: Rafał Bratoszewski

Government
  - Mayor: Jacek Lipiński (PO)

Area
  - Total: 13.82 km^{2} (5.34 sq mi)
- Elevation: 206 m (676 ft)

Population (30 June 2022)
  - Total: 22,160
  - Density: 1,603/km^{2} (4,150/sq mi)
- Time zone: UTC+1 (CET)
  - Summer (DST): UTC+2 (CEST)
- Postal codes: 95-069, 95-070
- Area code: +48 42
- Number plates: EZG
- Website: http://aleksandrow-lodzki.pl

Aleksandrów Łódzki ([alɛkˈsandruf ˈwut͡skʲi]) is a town in Zgierz County, Łódź Voivodeship, Poland. It is a part of the Łódź metropolitan area. Aleksandrów Łódzki has an area of 13.82 square kilometres (5.34 square miles), and as of June 2022 its population was 22,160.

== History ==
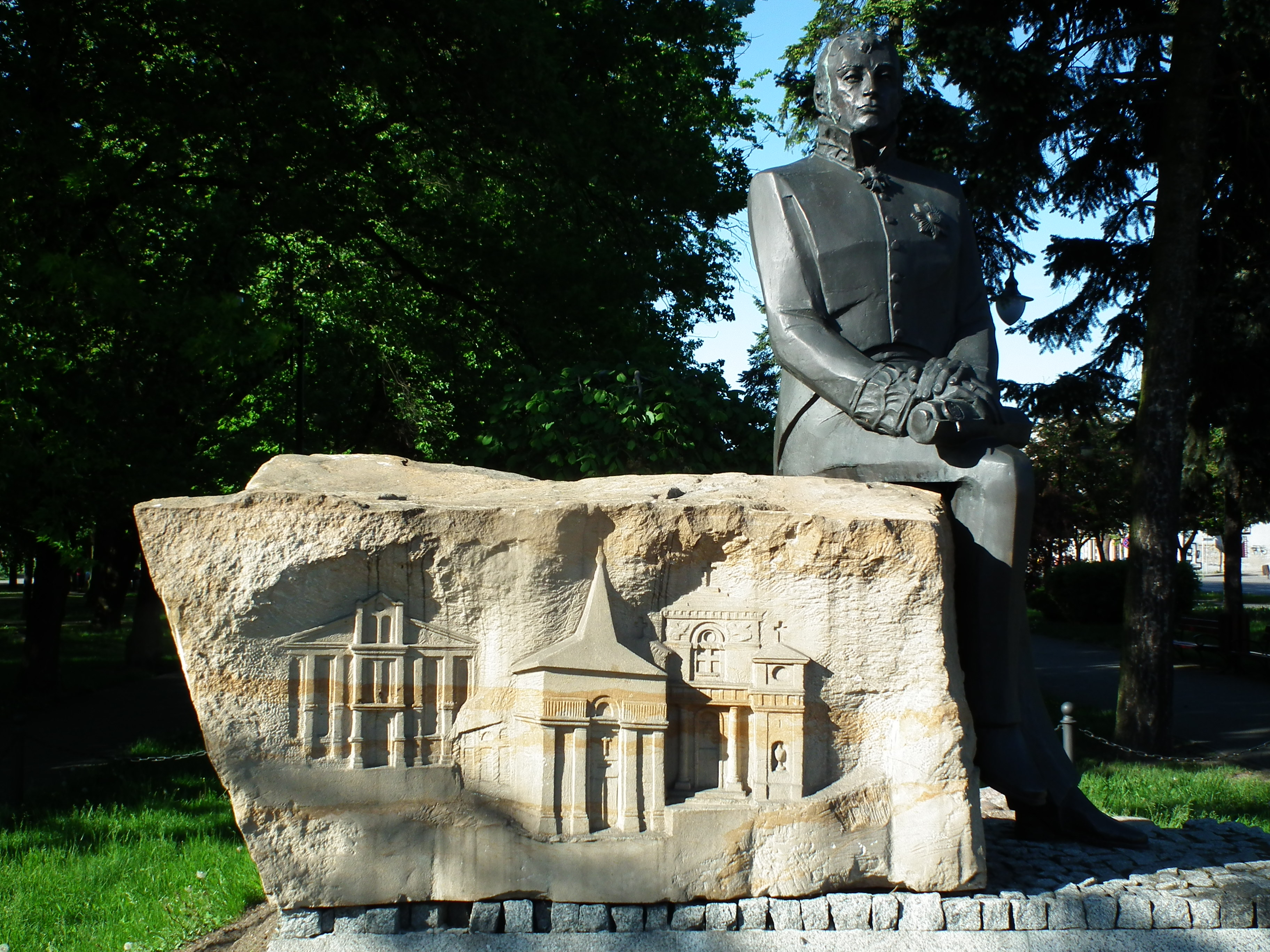
Memorial of Rafał Bratoszewski, the town's founder

The village was founded in 1816 by Rafał Bratoszewski. In 1820, Rajmund Rembieliński called Aleksandrów "one of the better towns in Poland." Bernard von Schuttenbach was the author of the town planning project. In order to gain sympathy of the government, Bratoszewski called the town after the then ruling Russian Emperor Alexander I Romanov. This resulted in Aleksandrów gaining the town rights in 1822. After Bratoszewski died in 1824, the Kossowski family took over the town.

After 1832, the town began to fall back, economically overwhelmed by the nearby towns of Pabianice, Zgierz and Łódź. In the late 19th century and early 20th century, many knitting companies were founded in Aleksandrów, so it is called the cradle of the Polish stocking industry and also gained the nickname "Sock-city" among the citizens. This trade is still the main one today. In 1910, the town gained a tram connection with Łódź, which was discontinued in 1991.

Historically, Aleksandrów was a town of multiple cultures and religions. There were Protestant descendants of German knitters, Jews who were in trade and Catholic Poles who mainly worked as craftsmen and in factories. The Jewish population in 1900 was 1,673. For the Jews, Aleksandrów was an important religious centre - the seat of Hasidic tzadikim of the Aleksander dynasty founded by Rabbi Yechiel Dancyger (1828–1894). It was also where Rabbi Chanokh Heynekh HaKohen Levin, the second Rebbe of the Ger Hasidim held court until his death in Aleksandrów in 1870.

In 1869, Aleksandrów lost its town rights. These rights were regained in 1924 in the newly reborn Poland.

After the German-Soviet invasion of Poland, which started World War II in September 1939, the town was occupied by Germany until 1945. In 1943–45, it was renamed by the occupiers to Wirkheim.

In September 2006, the first International Convention of Aleksandrów citizens was held.

== Economy ==
Currently, there are 2,623 registered companies in Aleksandrów. The textile industry constitutes 38% of the economy, trade - 24%, vehicle mechanics and transport - 5%, and other - 33%.

== Tourism ==
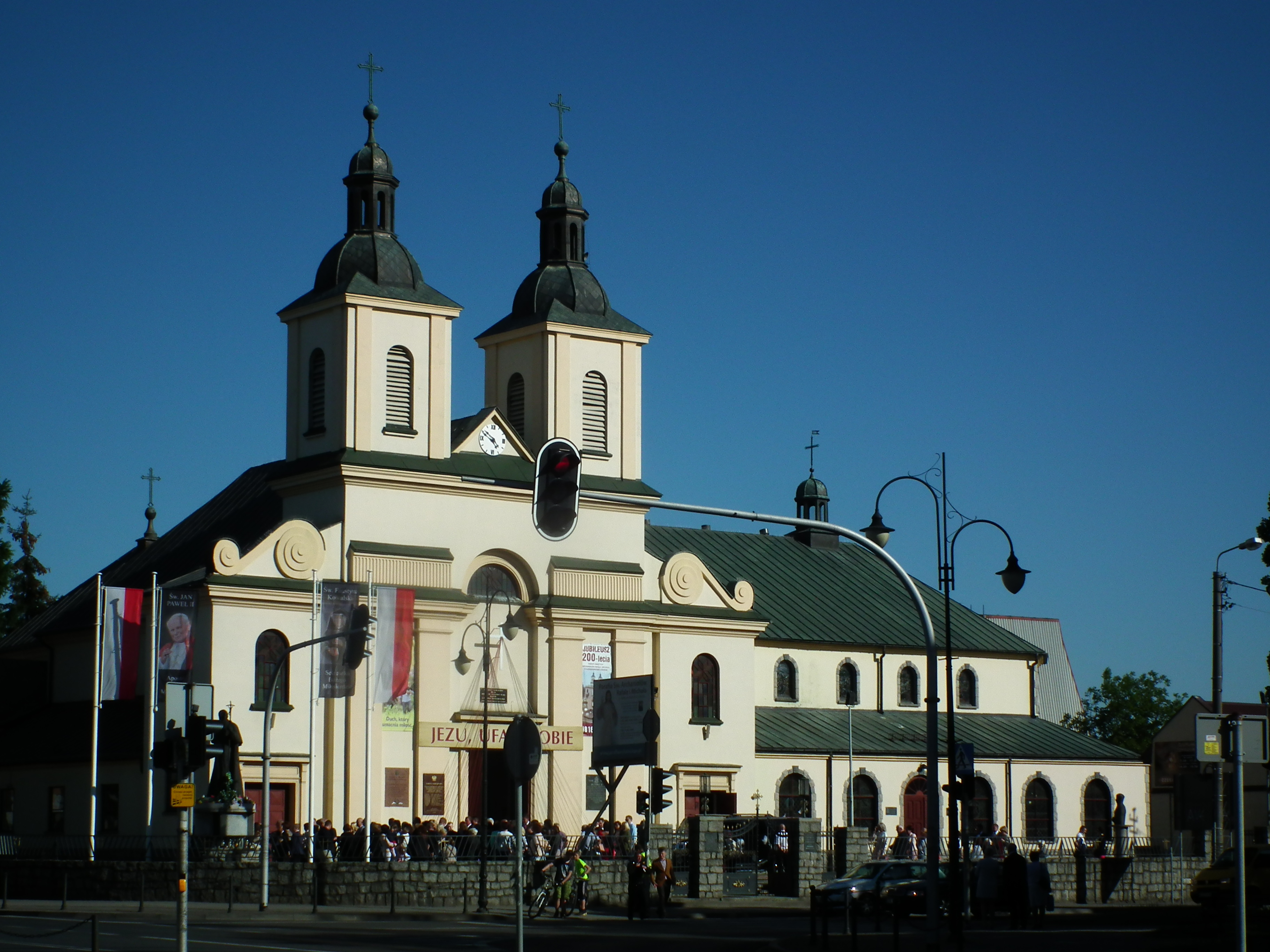
Saints Raphael and Michael Archangel church

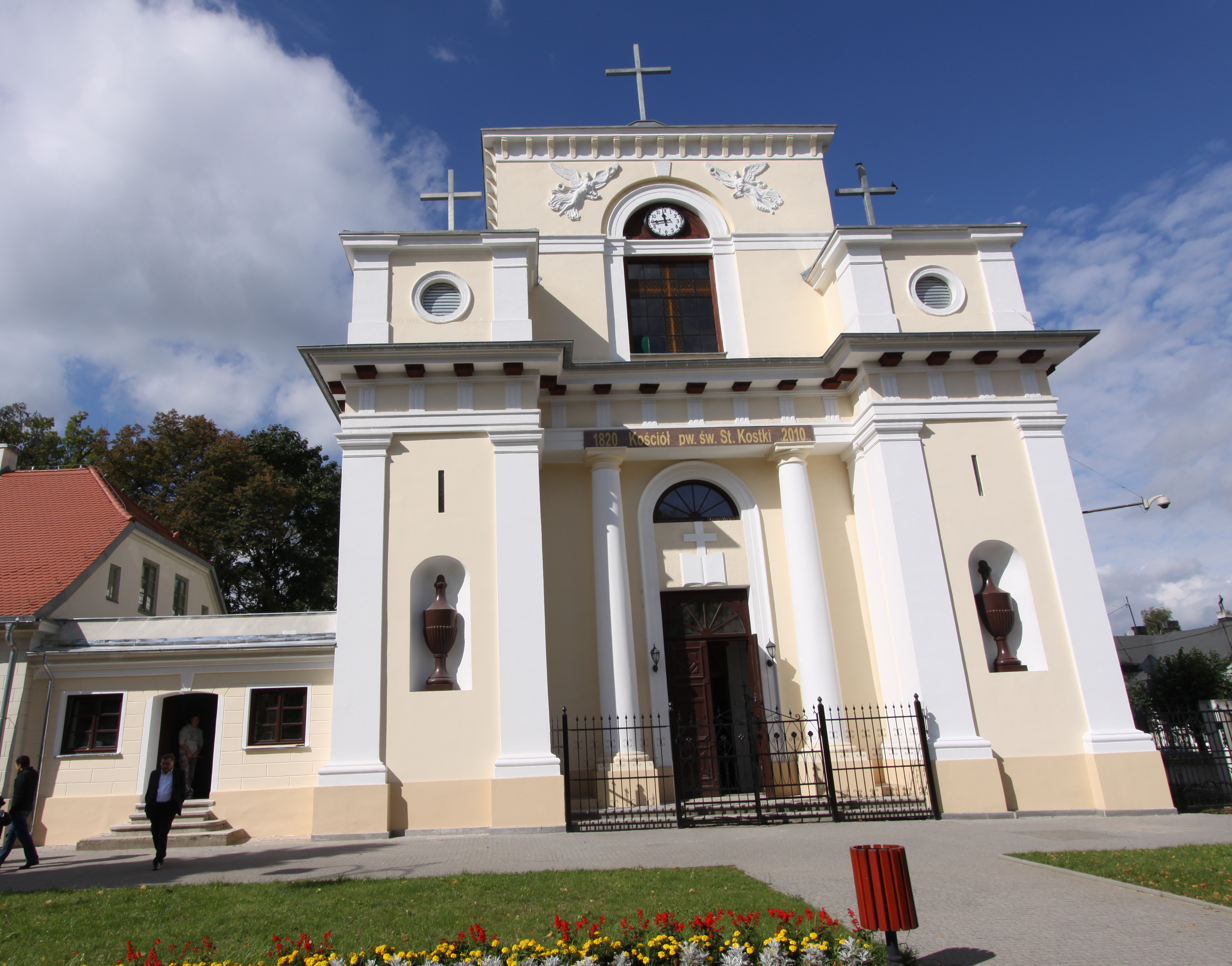
Saint Stanislaus Kostka church

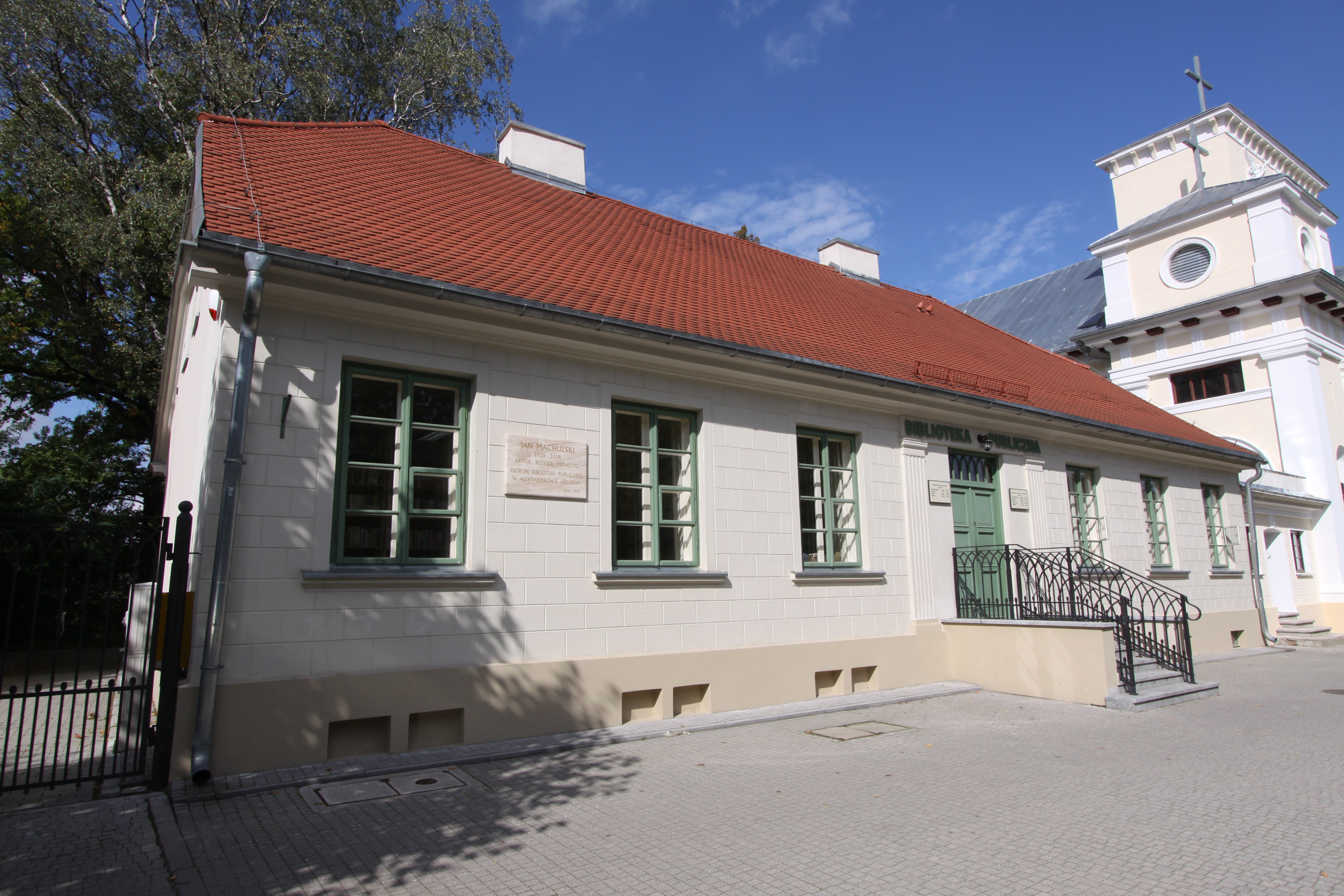
Public library

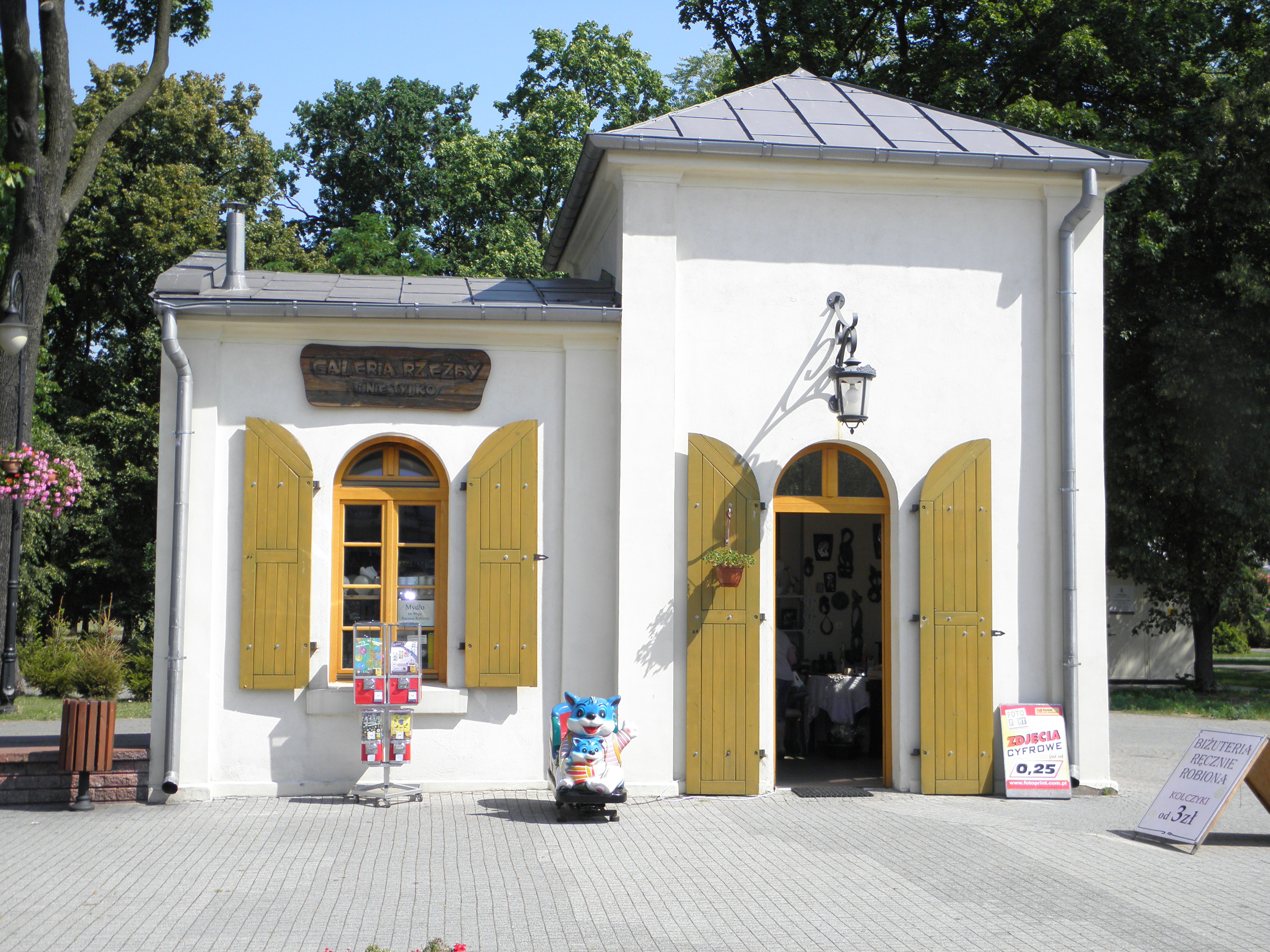
Old weigh house

The oldest monuments of Aleksandrów include:

- St. Rafael and Michael Catholic church - built between 1816 and 1818 and rebuilt three times (1922–1926 - two aisles added; 1933–1935 - two towers added; 1993 - added a second nave with its own altar). Under the church lies buried Rafał Bratoszewski - founder of Aleksandrów
- Evangelic church - built in 1828 by pastor Fryderyk Jerzy Tuve
- Jatki - rebuilt in 1998, formerly a place for butchers and bakers to sell their goods; now a part of the town hall
- The town hall - built in 1824. It still serves its function today
- The library - originally the house of a pastor built in 1848
- The oldest grave - dating from 1830, the place of burial for Fryderyk Jerzy Tuve. There is also a Jewish cemetery in the northern part of the town with graves of Hasidic tzadiks
- The municipal park - an English-styled garden founded by Rafał Bratoszewski in 1824
- Weaver houses - long wooden houses of the first settlers from the first half of the 19th century
- Albert Stiller's villa and factory - built in 1908
- Dormitory of Nicolaus Copernicus High School, a former mansion of Hasidic tzadikim from Danziger dynasty, built in 1935

== Demographics ==
Historical population
Year	Pop.	±%
1910	11,464	—
1921	8,236	−28.2%
1931	11,554	+40.3%
1939	13,333	+15.4%
1950	8,816	−33.9%
1960	12,179	+38.1%
2010	20,809	+70.9%

== Sports ==
- Towarzystwo Sportowe Sokół-Syguła. Founded in 1998, with soccer and karate sections. Stanisław Syguła is the chairman and main sponsor of the club
- MULKS Aleksandrów - established in 2004 - youth soccer
- MKS Aleksandrów - track and field athletics
- UKS Jedynka - volleyball

Sporting events

- Józef Jaworski track and field memorial - held annually since 1983

== Local media ==
- 40 i cztery (title is a reference to the tram line number 44 that connected Aleksandrów with Łódź) monthly bulletin issued by the local commune. It has appeared since 8 December 1991, formerly as a biweekly. Current editor-in-chief - Dorota Bełdowska-Zemła
- Alternatywy 44 monthly bulletin issued by the Aleksandrów Association of Entrepreneurs 2000. Current editor-in-chief - Tomasz Dominowski
- Wiadomości aleksandrowskie bulletin of St. by Rafael and Michael parish initiated by Rev. dr Norbert Rucki
- Aleksandrów wczoraj i dziś [Aleksandrów yesterday and today] - a yearly publication appearing since 1983 on behalf of Friends of Aleksandrów Association. Current editor-in-chief - Zenon Kozanecki
- Gazeta Matusiaka, independent newspaper issued by Grzegorz Matusiak in 1992–2004
- TELETOP TV

== International relations ==
=== Twin towns – sister cities ===
Aleksandrów Łódzki is twinned with:

- Krāslava, Latvia
- Ossiach, Austria
- Puget-Ville, France

== Notable people ==
- Izrael Poznański (1833–1900), Polish industrialist
- Włodzimierz Smolarek (1957–2012), Polish international footballer, player of Widzew Łódź, Feyenoord and FC Utrecht

== See also ==
- Aleksander (Hasidic dynasty)
