= Krzywiec, Łódź Voivodeship =

Krzywiec
- Village
- Location within Poland
- Coordinates: 51°46′45″N 19°17′23″E
- Country: Poland
- Voivodeship: Łódź
- County: Zgierz
- Gmina: Aleksandrów Łódzki
- Population: 110

Krzywiec [ˈkʂɨvʲɛt͡s] is a village in the administrative district of Gmina Aleksandrów Łódzki, within Zgierz County, Łódź Voivodeship, in central Poland.
