= Prawęcice =

- Village
- Location within Poland
- Coordinates: 51°52′N 19°10′E
- Country: Poland
- Voivodeship: Łódź
- County: Zgierz
- Gmina: Aleksandrów Łódzki

Prawęcice [pravɛnˈt͡ɕit͡sɛ] is a village in the administrative district of Gmina Aleksandrów Łódzki, within Zgierz County, Łódź Voivodeship, in central Poland.
