= Krzesin =

Krzesin may refer to the following places in Poland:

- Krzesin, Łódź Voivodeship (central Poland)
- Krzesin, Lubusz Voivodeship (west Poland)
- Krzesin Landscape Park, a protected area in Lubusz Voivodeship
