= Zgórze =

Zgórze may refer to the following places:

- Zgórze, Gmina Dąbrowice in Łódź Voivodeship (central Poland)
- Zgórze, Gmina Strzelce in Łódź Voivodeship (central Poland)
- Zgórze, Masovian Voivodeship (east-central Poland)
