= Adamowice =

Adamowice may refer to the following places:

- Adamowice, Lesser Poland Voivodeship (south Poland)
- Adamowice, Łódź Voivodeship (central Poland)
- Adamowice, Masovian Voivodeship (east-central Poland)
- Adamowice, Silesian Voivodeship (south Poland)
- Adamowice, Opole Voivodeship (south-west Poland)
