= Kozia Góra =

Kozia Góra may refer to the following places:

- Kozia Góra, Łódź Voivodeship, Poland
- Kozia Góra, Lublin Voivodeship, Poland
- Kozia Góra, Pomeranian Voivodeship, Poland
- Kozia Góra, Warmian-Masurian Voivodeship, Poland
- Kozia Góra, Stargard County, West Pomeranian Voivodeship, Poland
