= Baby, Kutno County =

Village in Poland

Baby
- Village
- Location within Poland
- Coordinates: 52°16′40″N 19°3′12″E
- Country: Poland
- Voivodeship: Łódź
- County: Kutno
- Gmina: Dąbrowice

Baby [ˈbabɨ] is a village in the administrative district of Gmina Dąbrowice, within Kutno County, Łódź Voivodeship, in central Poland.
