= Niedrzew Drugi =

- Village
- Location within Poland
- Coordinates: 52°20′9″N 19°20′47″E
- Country: Poland
- Voivodeship: Łódź
- County: Kutno
- Gmina: Strzelce

Niedrzew Drugi [ˈɲɛdʐɛf ˈdruɡi] is a village in the administrative district of Gmina Strzelce, within Kutno County, Łódź Voivodeship, in central Poland.
