= Sieciechów, Łódź Voivodeship =

Sieciechów
- Village
- Location within Poland
- Coordinates: 52°16′N 19°23′E
- Country: Poland
- Voivodeship: Łódź
- County: Kutno
- Gmina: Kutno

Sieciechów [ɕɛˈt͡ɕɛxuf] is a village in the administrative district of Gmina Kutno, within Kutno County, Łódź Voivodeship, in central Poland.

Sieciechów is near to Żurawieniec and Kuczków.
