= Krzesinówek =

- Settlement
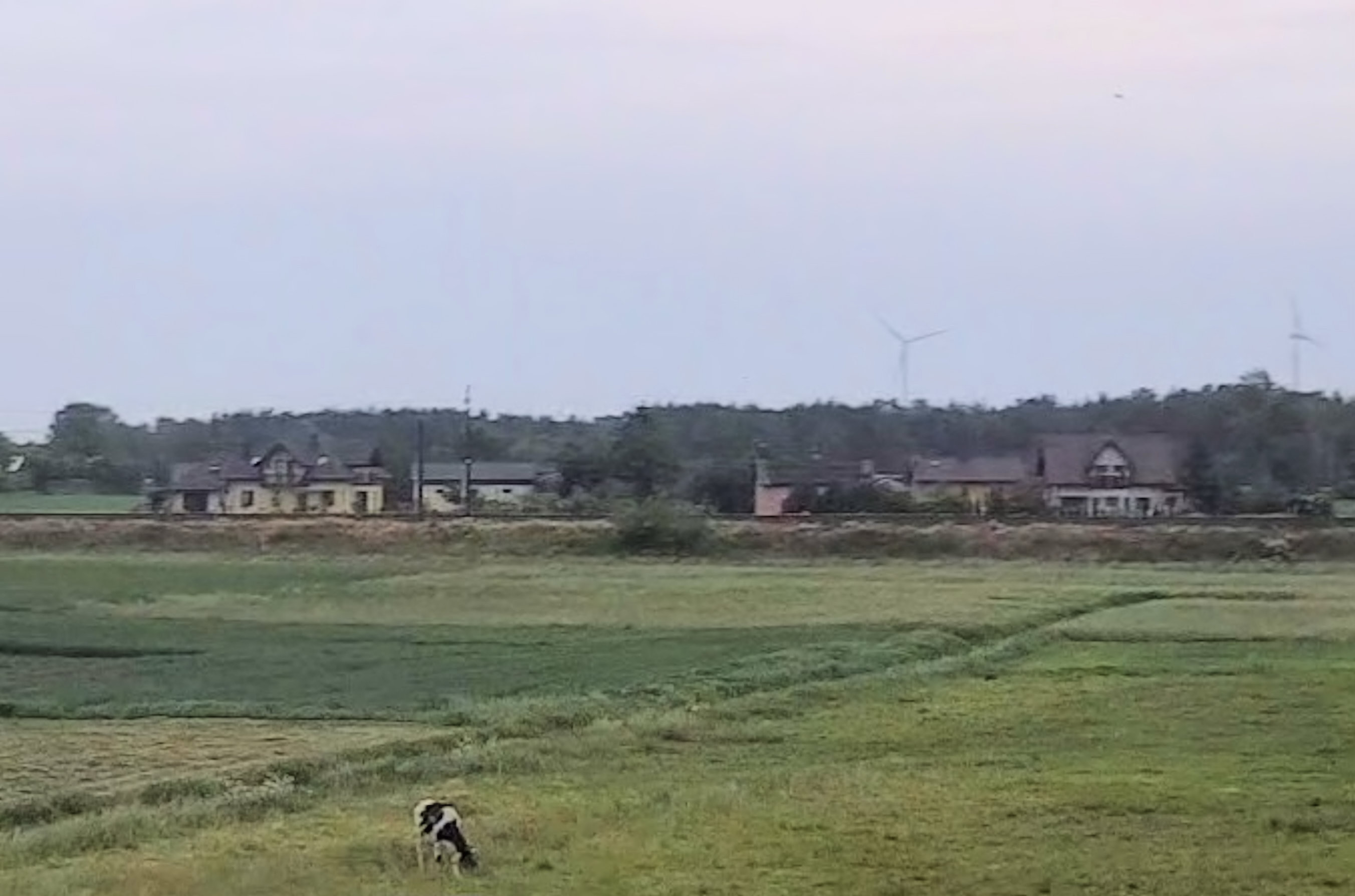

- Location within Poland
- Coordinates: 52°14′29″N 19°15′53″E
- Country: Poland
- Voivodeship: Łódź
- County: Kutno
- Gmina: Kutno

Krzesinówek [kʂɛɕiˈnuvɛk] is a settlement in the administrative district of Gmina Kutno, within Kutno County, Łódź Voivodeship, in central Poland.
