= Zgoda, Gmina Łanięta =

Zgoda
- Village
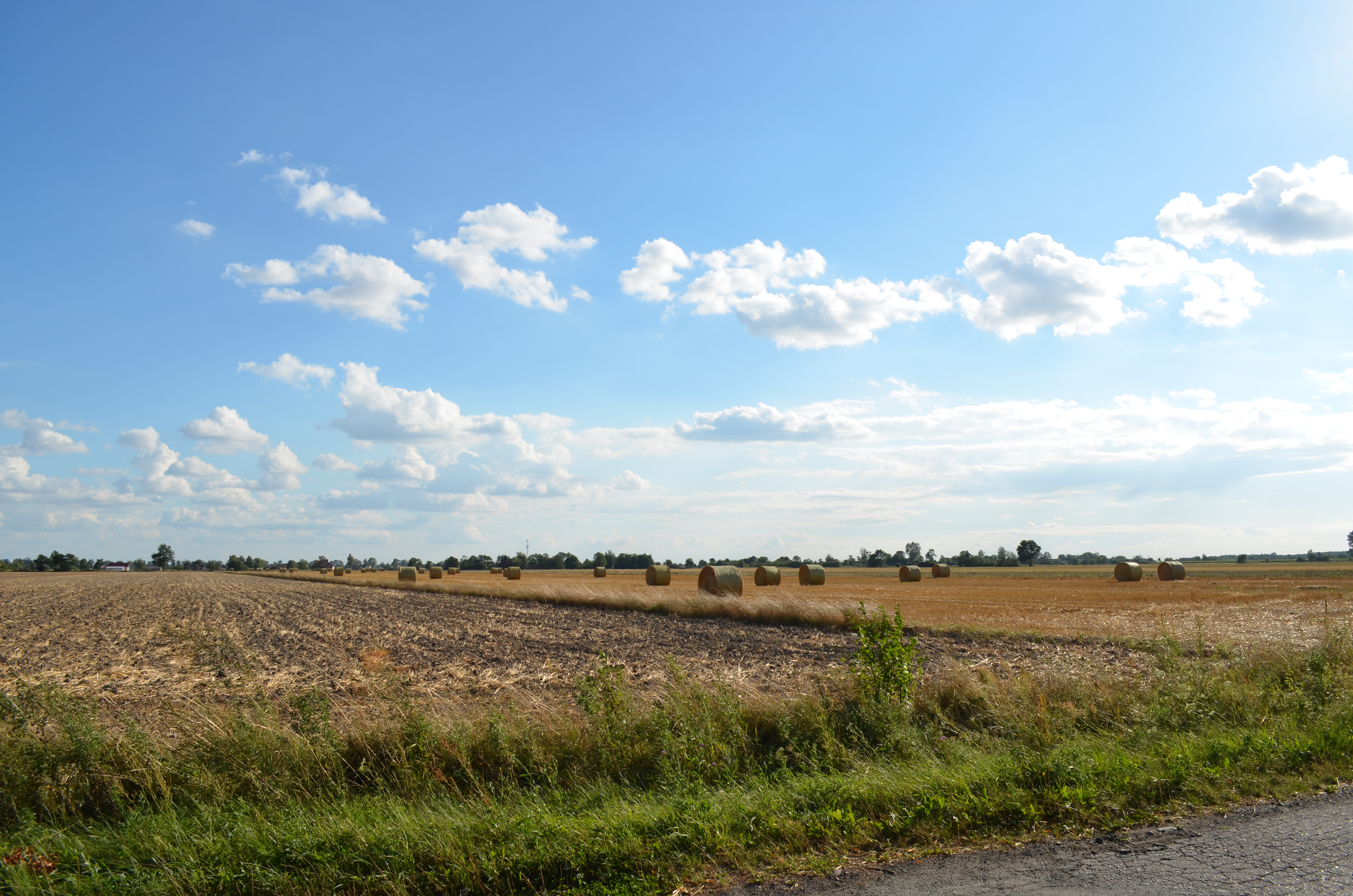

- Location within Poland
- Coordinates: 52°23′6″N 19°16′34″E
- Country: Poland
- Voivodeship: Łódź
- County: Kutno
- Gmina: Łanięta

Zgoda [ˈzɡɔda] is a village in the administrative district of Gmina Łanięta, within Kutno County, Łódź Voivodeship, in central Poland.
