= Kolonia Strzegocin =

- Settlement
- Location within Poland
- Coordinates: 52°10′N 19°22′E
- Country: Poland
- Voivodeship: Łódź
- County: Kutno
- Gmina: Kutno

Kolonia Strzegocin [kɔˈlɔɲa stʂɛˈɡɔt͡ɕin] is a settlement in the administrative district of Gmina Kutno, within Kutno County, Łódź Voivodeship, in central Poland.
