= Nutowo =

- Settlement
- Location within Poland
- Coordinates: 52°22′56″N 19°17′52″E
- Country: Poland
- Voivodeship: Łódź
- County: Kutno
- Gmina: Łanięta

Nutowo [nuˈtɔvɔ] is a settlement in the administrative district of Gmina Łanięta, within Kutno County, Łódź Voivodeship, in central Poland.
