= Chrosno, Łódź Voivodeship =

Chrosno
- Village
- Location within Poland
- Coordinates: 52°18′10″N 19°18′16″E
- Country: Poland
- Voivodeship: Łódź
- County: Kutno
- Gmina: Łanięta

Chrosno [ˈxrɔsnɔ] is a village in the administrative district of Gmina Łanięta, within Kutno County, Łódź Voivodeship, in central Poland.
