= Stara Wieś, Gmina Kutno =

Stara Wieś
- Village
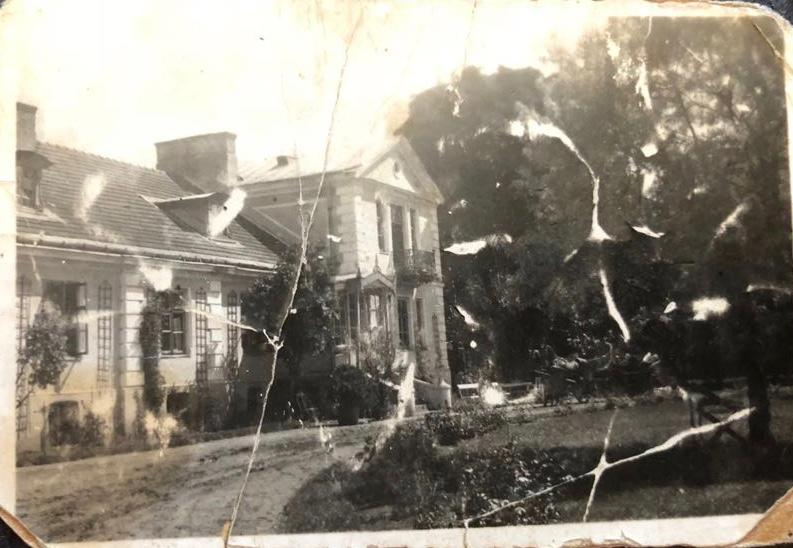

- Location within Poland
- Coordinates: 52°13′43″N 19°24′03″E
- Country: Poland
- Voivodeship: Łódź
- County: Kutno
- Gmina: Kutno

Stara Wieś [ˈstara ˈvjɛɕ] is a village in the administrative district of Gmina Kutno, within Kutno County, Łódź Voivodeship, in central Poland.
