= Nowe Sójki =

- Village
- Location within Poland
- Coordinates: 52°16′0″N 19°23′22″E
- Country: Poland
- Voivodeship: Łódź
- County: Kutno
- Gmina: Kutno
- Population: 140

Nowe Sójki [ˈnɔvɛ ˈsui̯ki] is a village in the administrative district of Gmina Kutno, within Kutno County, Łódź Voivodeship, in central Poland.
