= Wroczyny =

- Village
- Location within Poland
- Coordinates: 52°13′N 19°16′E
- Country: Poland
- Voivodeship: Łódź
- County: Kutno
- Gmina: Kutno

Wroczyny [vrɔˈt͡ʂɨnɨ] is a village in the administrative district of Gmina Kutno, within Kutno County, Łódź Voivodeship, in central Poland.
