= Augustopolis =

Augustopolis may refer to the following Ancient places:

- Augustopolis in Palaestina, ancient city of Palestine and bishopric, later a Latin Catholic titular see
- Augustopolis in Kilikia, ancient city of Kilikia, later a Latin Catholic titular see
- Augustopolis in Phrygia, Ancient city and suffragan bishopric of Synnada in Phrygia, later a Latin Catholic titular see; near the Turkish town Sürmene
- Augustopolis, old name of the city of Zaragoza in Spain

== See also ==
- Augustopol
