= Franciszków, Kutno County =

Franciszków
- Village
- Location within Poland
- Coordinates: 52°21′7″N 19°17′58″E
- Country: Poland
- Voivodeship: Łódź
- County: Kutno
- Gmina: Łanięta
- Population: 80

Franciszków (Polish pronunciation: [fraɲˈt͡ɕiʂkuf]) is a village in the administrative district of Gmina Łanięta, within Kutno County, Łódź Voivodeship, in central Poland.
