= Wysoka Duża =

- Village
- Location within Poland
- Coordinates: 52°11′16″N 19°13′12″E
- Country: Poland
- Voivodeship: Łódź
- County: Kutno
- Gmina: Kutno
- Population: 40

Wysoka Duża [vɨˈsɔka ˈduʐa] is a village in the administrative district of Gmina Kutno, within Kutno County, Łódź Voivodeship, in central Poland.
