= Anielin, Kutno County =

Anielin
- Village
- Location within Poland
- Coordinates: 52°23′18″N 19°17′24″E
- Country: Poland
- Voivodeship: Łódź
- County: Kutno
- Gmina: Łanięta
- Population: 80

Anielin [aˈɲɛlin] is a village in the administrative district of Gmina Łanięta, within Kutno County, Łódź Voivodeship, in central Poland.
