= Franki Wroczyńskie =

- Village
- Location within Poland
- Coordinates: 52°12′21″N 19°16′50″E
- Country: Poland
- Voivodeship: Łódź
- County: Kutno
- Gmina: Kutno

Franki Wroczyńskie [ˈfranki vrɔˈt͡ʂɨɲskʲɛ] is a village in the administrative district of Gmina Kutno, within Kutno County, Łódź Voivodeship, in central Poland.
