= Janiszew =

Janiszew may refer to the following places:

- Janiszew, Greater Poland Voivodeship (west-central Poland)
- Janiszew, Łódź Voivodeship (central Poland)
- Janiszew, Masovian Voivodeship (east-central Poland)
