= Dębina, Gmina Kutno =

Dębina
- Settlement
- Location within Poland
- Coordinates: 52°12′39″N 19°18′01″E
- Country: Poland
- Voivodeship: Łódź
- County: Kutno
- Gmina: Kutno

Dębina [dɛmˈbina] is a settlement in the administrative district of Gmina Kutno, within Kutno County, Łódź Voivodeship, in central Poland.
