= Podczachy =

Podczachy may refer to the following places in Poland:

- Podczachy, Łódź Voivodeship
- Podczachy, Masovian Voivodeship
