= Przyzórz =

- Village
- Location within Poland
- Coordinates: 52°18′6″N 19°30′6″E
- Country: Poland
- Voivodeship: Łódź
- County: Kutno
- Gmina: Strzelce

Przyzórz [ˈpʂɨzuʂ] is a village in the administrative district of Gmina Strzelce, within Kutno County, Łódź Voivodeship, in central Poland.
