= Piwki =

- Village
- Location within Poland
- Coordinates: 52°12′48″N 19°20′32″E
- Country: Poland
- Voivodeship: Łódź
- County: Kutno
- Gmina: Kutno

Piwki [ˈpifki] is a village in the administrative district of Gmina Kutno, within Kutno County, Łódź Voivodeship, in central Poland.
