= Ryków, Łódź Voivodeship =

Ryków
- Settlement
- Location within Poland
- Coordinates: 52°15′41″N 19°16′28″E
- Country: Poland
- Voivodeship: Łódź
- County: Kutno
- Gmina: Kutno

Ryków [ˈrɨkuf] is a settlement in the administrative district of Gmina Kutno, within Kutno County, Łódź Voivodeship, in central Poland.
