= Boża Wola, Łódź Voivodeship =

Boża Wola
- Village
- Location within Poland
- Coordinates: 52°12′N 19°28′E
- Country: Poland
- Voivodeship: Łódź
- County: Kutno
- Gmina: Kutno
- Population: 210

Boża Wola [ˈbɔʐa ˈvɔla] is a village in the administrative district of Gmina Kutno, within Kutno County, Łódź Voivodeship, in central Poland.
