= Raciborów =

Raciborów may refer to the following places:

- Raciborów, Greater Poland Voivodeship (west-central Poland)
- Raciborów, Łódź Voivodeship (central Poland)
- Raciborów, West Pomeranian Voivodeship (north-west Poland)
