= Julinki =

- Village
- Location within Poland
- Coordinates: 52°10′37″N 19°20′6″E
- Country: Poland
- Voivodeship: Łódź
- County: Kutno
- Gmina: Kutno

Julinki [juˈlinki] is a village in the administrative district of Gmina Kutno, within Kutno County, Łódź Voivodeship, in central Poland.
