= Długołęka, Łódź Voivodeship =

Długołęka
- Village
- Location within Poland
- Coordinates: 52°19′49″N 19°28′24″E
- Country: Poland
- Voivodeship: Łódź
- County: Kutno
- Gmina: Strzelce

Długołęka (Polish pronunciation: [dwuɡɔˈwɛŋka]) is a village in the administrative district of Gmina Strzelce, within Kutno County, Łódź Voivodeship, in central Poland.
