= Bronisławów, Kutno County =

Bronisławów
- Village
- Location within Poland
- Coordinates: 52°18′51″N 19°15′29″E
- Country: Poland
- Voivodeship: Łódź
- County: Kutno
- Gmina: Łanięta
- Population: 40

Bronisławów [brɔniˈswavuf] is a village in the administrative district of Gmina Łanięta, within Kutno County, Łódź Voivodeship, in central Poland.
