= Siemianów =

Siemianów may refer to the following places in Poland:

- Siemianów, Lower Silesian Voivodeship (south-west Poland)
- Siemianów, Łódź Voivodeship (central Poland)
