= Kąty, Kutno County =

Kąty
- Village
- Location within Poland
- Coordinates: 52°21′37″N 19°13′1″E
- Country: Poland
- Voivodeship: Łódź
- County: Kutno
- Gmina: Łanięta

Kąty [ˈkɔntɨ] is a village in the administrative district of Gmina Łanięta, within Kutno County, Łódź Voivodeship, in central Poland.
