= Nowy Gołębiew =

- Village
- Location within Poland
- Coordinates: 52°15′46″N 19°21′11″E
- Country: Poland
- Voivodeship: Łódź
- County: Kutno
- Gmina: Kutno
- Population: 720

Nowy Gołębiew [ˈnɔvɨ ɡɔˈwɛmbjɛf] is a village in the administrative district of Gmina Kutno, within Kutno County, Łódź Voivodeship, in central Poland.
