= Sójki-Parcel =

- Village
- Location within Poland
- Coordinates: 52°17′15″N 19°24′15″E
- Country: Poland
- Voivodeship: Łódź
- County: Kutno
- Gmina: Strzelce
- Population: 60

Sójki-Parcel [ˈsui̯ki ˈpart͡sɛl] is a village in the administrative district of Gmina Strzelce, within Kutno County, Łódź Voivodeship, in central Poland.
