= Wysoka Wielka, Łódź Voivodeship =

Wysoka Wielka
- Village
- Location within Poland
- Coordinates: 52°11′36″N 19°13′14″E
- Country: Poland
- Voivodeship: Łódź
- County: Kutno
- Gmina: Kutno

Wysoka Wielka [vɨˈsɔka ˈvjɛlka] is a village in the administrative district of Gmina Kutno, within Kutno County, Łódź Voivodeship, in central Poland.
