= Marianki =

Marianki may refer to the following places:

- Marianki, Lipno County in Kuyavian-Pomeranian Voivodeship (north-central Poland)
- Marianki, Rypin County in Kuyavian-Pomeranian Voivodeship (north-central Poland)
- Marianki, Świecie County in Kuyavian-Pomeranian Voivodeship (north-central Poland)
- Marianki, Łódź Voivodeship (central Poland)
- Marianki, Nowa Sól County in Lubusz Voivodeship (west Poland)
- Marianki, Sulęcin County in Lubusz Voivodeship (west Poland)
- Marianki, Białobrzegi County in Masovian Voivodeship (east-central Poland)
- Marianki, Lipsko County in Masovian Voivodeship (east-central Poland)
