= Łojewka =

- Settlement
- Location within Poland
- Coordinates: 52°19′01″N 19°02′27″E
- Country: Poland
- Voivodeship: Łódź
- County: Kutno
- Gmina: Dąbrowice

Łojewka [wɔˈjɛfka] is a settlement in the administrative district of Gmina Dąbrowice, within Kutno County, Łódź Voivodeship, in central Poland.
