= Mariopol =

- Village
- Location within Poland
- Coordinates: 52°19′53″N 19°3′57″E
- Country: Poland
- Voivodeship: Łódź
- County: Kutno
- Gmina: Dąbrowice

Mariopol [maˈrjɔpɔl] (German Friedrichstal) is a village in the administrative district of Gmina Dąbrowice, within Kutno County, Łódź Voivodeship, in central Poland.
