= Gnojno =

Gnojno may refer to the following places:

- Gnojno, Inowrocław County in Kuyavian-Pomeranian Voivodeship (north-central Poland)
- Gnojno, Lipno County in Kuyavian-Pomeranian Voivodeship (north-central Poland)
- Gnojno, Lublin Voivodeship (east Poland)
- Gnojno, Łódź Voivodeship (central Poland)
- Gnojno, Świętokrzyskie Voivodeship (south-central Poland)
- Gnojno, Masovian Voivodeship (east-central Poland)
- Gnojno, Warmian-Masurian Voivodeship (north Poland)
