= Świecinki =

- Village
- Location within Poland
- Coordinates: 52°19′21″N 19°15′20″E
- Country: Poland
- Voivodeship: Łódź
- County: Kutno
- Gmina: Łanięta
- Population: 60

Świecinki (Polish pronunciation: [ɕfjɛˈt͡ɕinkʲi]) is a village in the administrative district of Gmina Łanięta, within Kutno County, Łódź Voivodeship, in central Poland.
