= Wieszczyce, Łódź Voivodeship =

Wieszczyce
- Village
- Location within Poland
- Coordinates: 52°18′19″N 19°22′33″E
- Country: Poland
- Voivodeship: Łódź
- County: Kutno
- Gmina: Strzelce
- Population: 110

Wieszczyce [vjɛʂˈt͡ʂɨt͡sɛ] is a village in the administrative district of Gmina Strzelce, within Kutno County, Łódź Voivodeship, in central Poland.
