= Nowe Budy =

Nowe Budy may refer to the following places:

- Nowe Budy, Łódź Voivodeship (central Poland)
- Nowe Budy, Gmina Leoncin, Nowy Dwór County in Masovian Voivodeship (east-central Poland)
- Nowe Budy, Wyszków County in Masovian Voivodeship (east-central Poland)
- Nowe Budy, Żyrardów County in Masovian Voivodeship (east-central Poland)
