= Marianów, Gmina Łanięta =

Marianów
- Settlement
- Location within Poland
- Coordinates: 52°19′18″N 19°16′18″E
- Country: Poland
- Voivodeship: Łódź
- County: Kutno
- Gmina: Łanięta

Marianów [maˈrjanuf] is a village in the administrative district of Gmina Łanięta, in Kutno County, Łódź Voivodeship, in central Poland.
