= Dąbkowice =

Dąbkowice may refer to the following places:

- Dąbkowice, Greater Poland Voivodeship (west-central Poland)
- Dąbkowice, Łódź Voivodeship (central Poland)
- Dąbkowice, West Pomeranian Voivodeship (north-west Poland)
