= Zaranna =

- Village
- Location within Poland
- Coordinates: 52°19′48″N 19°23′3″E
- Country: Poland
- Voivodeship: Łódź
- County: Kutno
- Gmina: Strzelce
- Population: 60

Zaranna [zaˈranna] is a village in the administrative district of Gmina Strzelce, within Kutno County, Łódź Voivodeship, in central Poland.
