= Michałów, Kutno County =

Michałów
- Village
- Location within Poland
- Coordinates: 52°16′9″N 19°19′43″E
- Country: Poland
- Voivodeship: Łódź
- County: Kutno
- Gmina: Kutno

Michałów [miˈxawuf] is a village in the administrative district of Gmina Kutno, within Kutno County, Łódź Voivodeship, in central Poland.
