= Nowa Wieś, Gmina Kutno =

Nowa Wieś
- Village
- Location within Poland
- Coordinates: 52°11′48″N 19°21′23″E
- Country: Poland
- Voivodeship: Łódź
- County: Kutno
- Gmina: Kutno
- Population (approx.): 150

Nowa Wieś [ˈnɔva ˈvjɛɕ] is a village in the administrative district of Gmina Kutno, within Kutno County, Łódź Voivodeship, in central Poland.

The village has an approximate population of 150. It has a mostly rural character, and its residents mainly depend on farming, while some also rely on the nearby city of Kutno for work and services.

In Nowa Wieś is located the exact geodetic center of Poland - a centroid of the entire territory of Poland. Its coordinates are 52°11'27.95" N and 19°21'19.46" E.
