= Sójki, Łódź Voivodeship =

Sójki
- Village
- Location within Poland
- Coordinates: 52°16′51″N 19°23′36″E
- Country: Poland
- Voivodeship: Łódź
- County: Kutno
- Gmina: Strzelce

Sójki [ˈsui̯ki] is a village in the administrative district of Gmina Strzelce, within Kutno County, Łódź Voivodeship, in central Poland.
