= Głogowiec, Kutno County =

Głogowiec
- Village
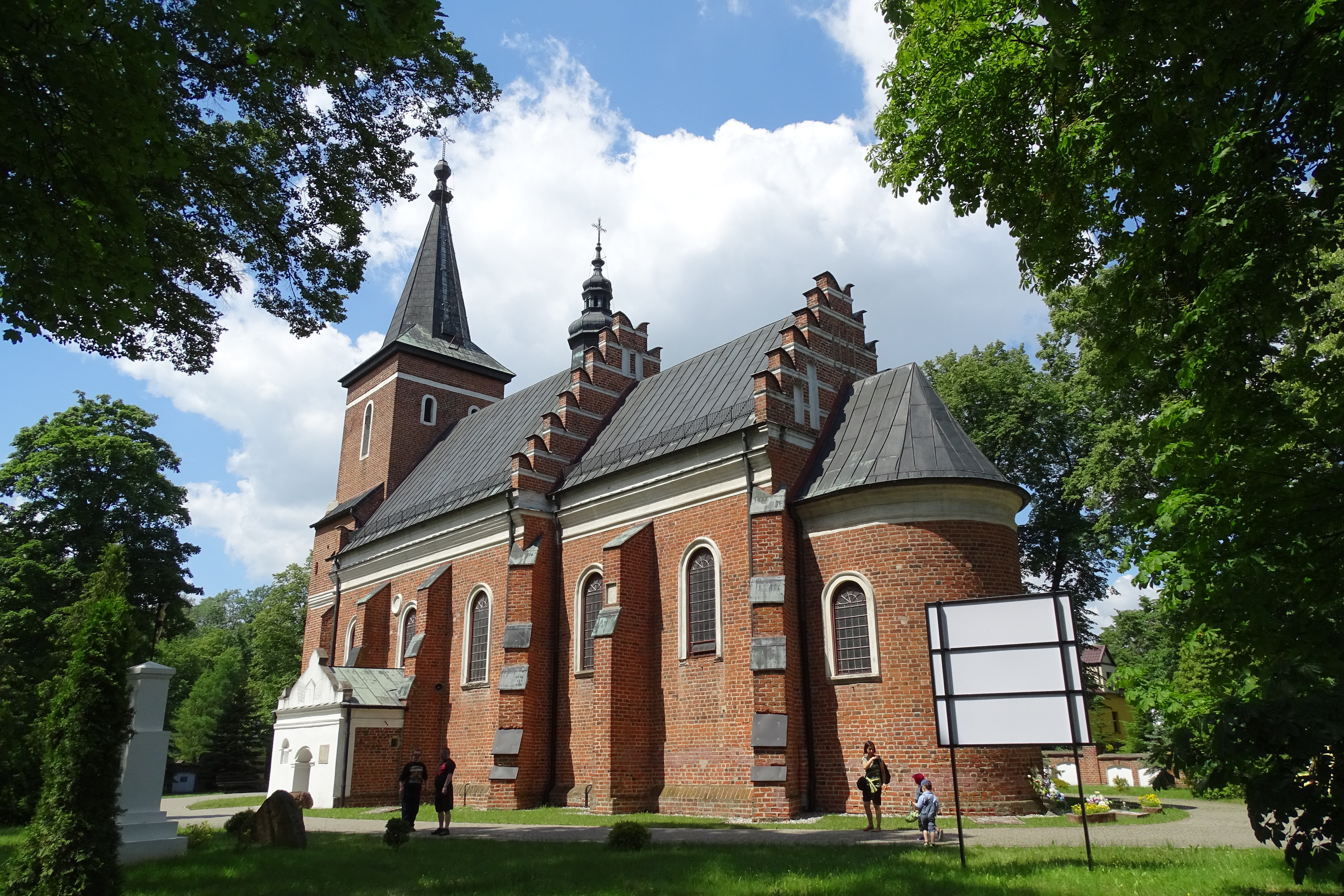
- Church of the Virgin Mary, built in the 15th century

- Location within Poland
- Coordinates: 52°16′55″N 19°19′32″E
- Country: Poland
- Voivodeship: Łódź
- County: Kutno
- Gmina: Kutno

Głogowiec [ɡwɔˈɡɔvjɛt͡s] is a village in the administrative district of Gmina Kutno, within Kutno County, Łódź Voivodeship, in central Poland.
