= Bielawki =

Bielawki may refer to the following places:

- Bielawki, Kuyavian-Pomeranian Voivodeship (north-central Poland)
- Bielawki, Łódź Voivodeship (central Poland)
- Bielawki, Kartuzy County in Pomeranian Voivodeship (north Poland)
- Bielawki, Tczew County in Pomeranian Voivodeship (north Poland)
