= Krzesin-Parcel =

- Settlement
- Location within Poland
- Coordinates: 52°14′11″N 19°15′46″E
- Country: Poland
- Voivodeship: Łódź
- County: Kutno
- Gmina: Kutno

Krzesin-Parcel [ˈkʂɛɕin ˈpart͡sɛl] is a settlement in the administrative district of Gmina Kutno, within Kutno County, Łódź Voivodeship, in central Poland.
