= Woźniaków =

- Village
- Location within Poland
- Coordinates: 52°13′29″N 19°18′16″E
- Country: Poland
- Voivodeship: Łódź
- County: Kutno
- Gmina: Kutno

Woźniaków [vɔʑˈɲakuf] is a village in the administrative district of Gmina Kutno, within Kutno County, Łódź Voivodeship, in central Poland.
