= Żurawieniec, Kutno County =

Żurawieniec
- Village
- Location within Poland
- Coordinates: 52°15′44″N 19°22′49″E
- Country: Poland
- Voivodeship: Łódź
- County: Kutno
- Gmina: Kutno

Żurawieniec [ʐuraˈvjɛɲɛt͡s] is a village in the administrative district of Gmina Kutno, within Kutno County, Łódź Voivodeship, in central Poland.
