= Adamów, Kutno County =

Adamów
- Village
- Location within Poland
- Coordinates: 52°16′19″N 19°17′27″E
- Country: Poland
- Voivodeship: Łódź
- County: Kutno
- Gmina: Kutno

Adamów [aˈdamuf] is a village in the administrative district of Gmina Kutno, within Kutno County, Łódź Voivodeship, in central Poland.
