= Rozopol =

- Village
- Location within Poland
- Coordinates: 52°19′46″N 19°3′18″E
- Country: Poland
- Voivodeship: Łódź
- County: Kutno
- Gmina: Dąbrowice

Rozopol [rɔˈzɔpɔl] is a village in the administrative district of Gmina Dąbrowice, within Kutno County, Łódź Voivodeship, in central Poland.
