= Świeciny =

- Village
- Location within Poland
- Coordinates: 52°18′29″N 19°15′13″E
- Country: Poland
- Voivodeship: Łódź
- County: Kutno
- Gmina: Łanięta

Świeciny (Polish pronunciation: [ɕfjɛˈt͡ɕinɨ]) is a village in the administrative district of Gmina Łanięta, within Kutno County, Łódź Voivodeship, in central Poland.
