= Lipie, Kutno County =

Lipie
- Settlement
- Location within Poland
- Coordinates: 52°20′N 19°15′E
- Country: Poland
- Voivodeship: Łódź
- County: Kutno
- Gmina: Łanięta

Lipie [ˈlipjɛ] is a settlement in the administrative district of Gmina Łanięta, within Kutno County, Łódź Voivodeship, in central Poland.
