= Malina, Łódź Voivodeship =

Malina
- Village
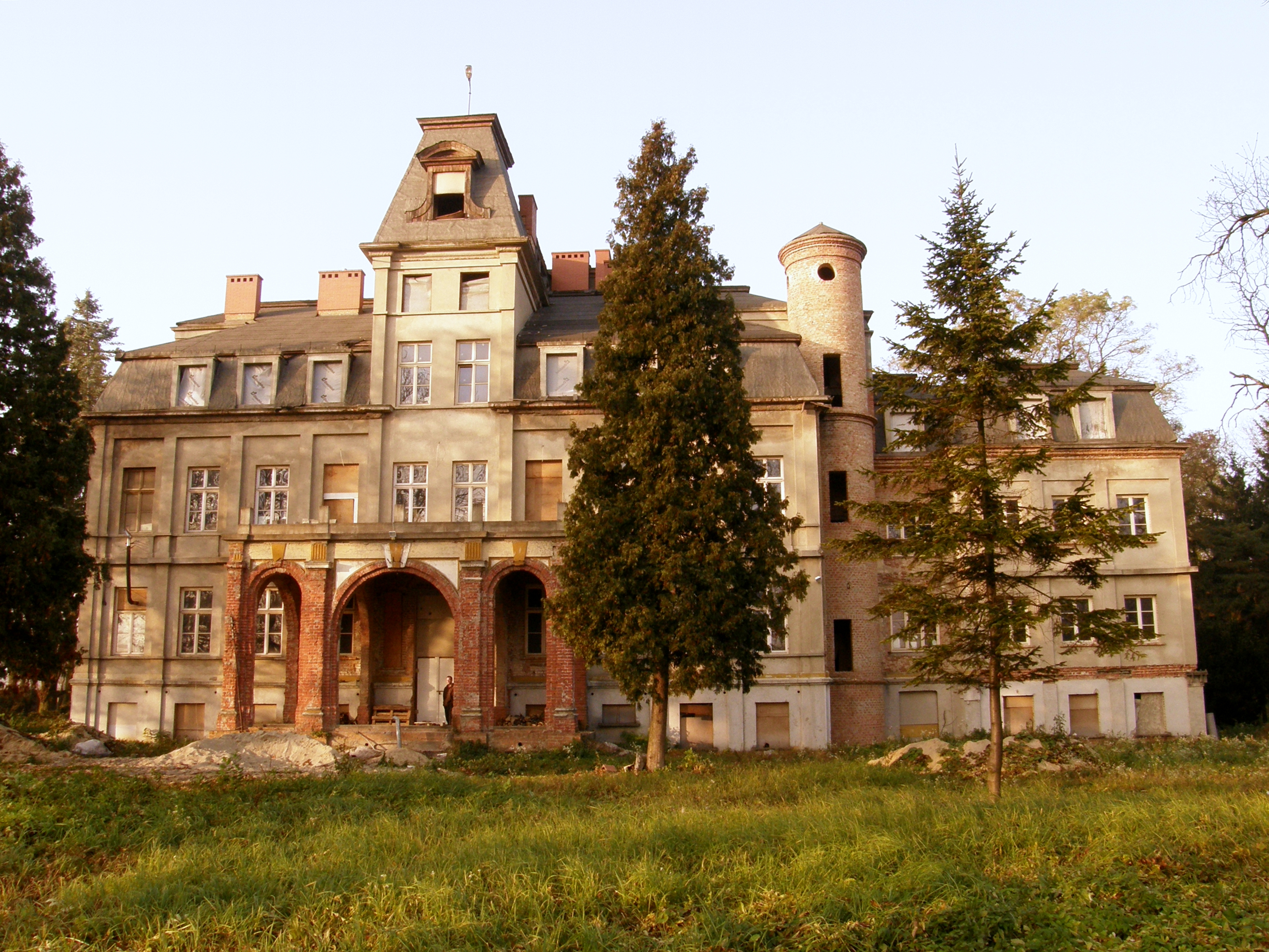
- Palace

- Location within Poland
- Coordinates: 52°14′N 19°24′E
- Country: Poland
- Voivodeship: Łódź
- County: Kutno
- Gmina: Kutno

Malina [maˈlina] is a village in the administrative district of Gmina Kutno, within Kutno County, Łódź Voivodeship, in central Poland.
