= Wierzbie =

Wierzbie may refer to the following places:

- Wierzbie, Lesser Poland Voivodeship (south Poland)
- Wierzbie, Łódź Voivodeship (central Poland)
- Wierzbie, Lublin Voivodeship (east Poland)
- Wierzbie, Świętokrzyskie Voivodeship (south-central Poland)
- Wierzbie, Greater Poland Voivodeship (west-central Poland)
- Wierzbie, Silesian Voivodeship (south Poland)
- Wierzbie, Nysa County in Opole Voivodeship (south-west Poland)
- Wierzbie, Olesno County in Opole Voivodeship (south-west Poland)
