= Kolonia Sójki =

- Settlement
- Location within Poland
- Coordinates: 52°16′13″N 19°22′52″E
- Country: Poland
- Voivodeship: Łódź
- County: Kutno
- Gmina: Kutno

Kolonia Sójki [kɔˈlɔɲa ˈsui̯ki] is a settlement in the administrative district of Gmina Kutno, within Kutno County, Łódź Voivodeship, in central Poland.
