= Nagodów, Łódź Voivodeship =

Nagodów
- Village
- Location within Poland
- Coordinates: 52°11′N 19°22′E
- Country: Poland
- Voivodeship: Łódź
- County: Kutno
- Gmina: Kutno
- Population (approx.): 100

Nagodów [naˈɡɔduf] is a village of about a hundred people in the administrative district of Gmina Kutno, within Kutno County, Łódź Voivodeship, in central Poland.
