= Nowa Kozia Góra =

- Settlement
- Location within Poland
- Coordinates: 52°19′25″N 19°25′44″E
- Country: Poland
- Voivodeship: Łódź
- County: Kutno
- Gmina: Strzelce

Nowa Kozia Góra [ˈnɔva ˈkɔʑa ˈɡura] is a settlement in the administrative district of Gmina Strzelce, within Kutno County, Łódź Voivodeship, in central Poland.
