= Siemiennik =

- Settlement
- Location within Poland
- Coordinates: 52°13′8″N 19°16′52″E
- Country: Poland
- Voivodeship: Łódź
- County: Kutno
- Gmina: Kutno

Siemiennik [ɕɛˈmjɛnnik] is a settlement in the administrative district of Gmina Kutno, within Kutno County, Łódź Voivodeship, in central Poland.
