= Witoldów, Kutno County =

Witoldów
- Village
- Location within Poland
- Coordinates: 52°21′29″N 19°15′24″E
- Country: Poland
- Voivodeship: Łódź
- County: Kutno
- Gmina: Łanięta

Witoldów (Polish pronunciation: [viˈtɔlduf]) is a village in the administrative district of Gmina Łanięta, within Kutno County, Łódź Voivodeship, in central Poland.
