= Sieraków, Łódź Voivodeship =

Sieraków
- Village
- Location within Poland
- Coordinates: 52°14′26″N 19°25′55″E
- Country: Poland
- Voivodeship: Łódź
- County: Kutno
- Gmina: Kutno

Sieraków (Polish pronunciation: [ɕɛˈrakuf]) is a village in the administrative district of Gmina Kutno, within Kutno County, Łódź Voivodeship, in central Poland.
