= Dudki, Kutno County =

Dudki
- Settlement
- Location within Poland
- Coordinates: 52°12′58″N 19°20′11″E
- Country: Poland
- Voivodeship: Łódź
- County: Kutno
- Gmina: Kutno

Dudki [ˈdutki] is a settlement in the administrative district of Gmina Kutno, within Kutno County, Łódź Voivodeship, in central Poland.
