= Marianka, Gmina Strzelce =

Marianka
- Village
- Location within Poland
- Coordinates: 52°17′41″N 19°28′30″E
- Country: Poland
- Voivodeship: Łódź
- County: Kutno
- Gmina: Strzelce

Marianka [maˈrjaŋka] is a village in the administrative district of Gmina Strzelce, within Kutno County, Łódź Voivodeship, in central Poland.
