= Byszew-Kaczyn =

- Village
- Location within Poland
- Coordinates: 52°11′22″N 19°15′39″E
- Country: Poland
- Voivodeship: Łódź
- County: Kutno
- Gmina: Kutno

Byszew-Kaczyn [ˈbɨʂɛf ˈkat͡ʂɨn] is a village in the administrative district of Gmina Kutno, within Kutno County, Łódź Voivodeship, in central Poland.
