= Iwiny =

Iwiny may refer to the following places in Poland:

- Iwiny, Bolesławiec County in Lower Silesian Voivodeship (south-west Poland)
- Iwiny, Wrocław County in Lower Silesian Voivodeship (south-west Poland)
- Iwiny, Łódź Voivodeship (central Poland)
