= Glinice, Łódź Voivodeship =

Glinice
- Village
- Location within Poland
- Coordinates: 52°19′18″N 19°26′51″E
- Country: Poland
- Voivodeship: Łódź
- County: Kutno
- Gmina: Strzelce

Glinice [ɡliˈnit͡sɛ] is a village in the administrative district of Gmina Strzelce, within Kutno County, Łódź Voivodeship, in central Poland.
