= Karolew, Gmina Strzelce =

Karolew
- Village
- Location within Poland
- Coordinates: 52°19′27″N 19°23′38″E
- Country: Poland
- Voivodeship: Łódź
- County: Kutno
- Gmina: Strzelce

Karolew [kaˈrɔlɛf] is a village in the administrative district of Gmina Strzelce, within Kutno County, Łódź Voivodeship, in central Poland.
