= Dzięgost =

- Settlement
- Location within Poland
- Coordinates: 52°19′4″N 19°6′20″E
- Country: Poland
- Voivodeship: Łódź
- County: Kutno
- Gmina: Dąbrowice

Dzięgost [ˈd͡ʑɛnɡɔst] is a settlement in the administrative district of Gmina Dąbrowice, within Kutno County, Łódź Voivodeship, in central Poland.
