= Piotrowo, Łódź Voivodeship =

Piotrowo
- Settlement
- Location within Poland
- Coordinates: 52°18′24″N 19°04′21″E
- Country: Poland
- Voivodeship: Łódź
- County: Kutno
- Gmina: Dąbrowice

Piotrowo [pjɔˈtrɔvɔ] is a settlement in the administrative district of Gmina Dąbrowice, within Kutno County, Łódź Voivodeship, in central Poland.
