= Wola Chruścińska =

- Village
- Location within Poland
- Coordinates: 52°18′N 19°17′E
- Country: Poland
- Voivodeship: Łódź
- County: Kutno
- Gmina: Łanięta

Wola Chruścińska [ˈvɔla xruɕˈt͡ɕiɲska] is a village in the administrative district of Gmina Łanięta, within Kutno County, Łódź Voivodeship, in central Poland. Actor Robert Więckiewicz was born and raised in the village.
