= Rajmundów =

- Village
- Location within Poland
- Coordinates: 52°22′N 19°16′E
- Country: Poland
- Voivodeship: Łódź
- County: Kutno
- Gmina: Łanięta

Rajmundów [rai̯ˈmunduf] is a village in the administrative district of Gmina Łanięta, within Kutno County, Łódź Voivodeship, in the middle of Poland.
