= Kuczków, Kutno County =

Kuczków
- Village
- Location within Poland
- Coordinates: 52°15′51″N 19°21′57″E
- Country: Poland
- Voivodeship: Łódź
- County: Kutno
- Gmina: Kutno

Kuczków [ˈkut͡ʂkuf] is a village in the administrative district of Gmina Kutno, within Kutno County, Łódź Voivodeship, in central Poland.
