= Komadzyn =

- Village
- Location within Poland
- Coordinates: 52°15′8″N 19°26′6″E
- Country: Poland
- Voivodeship: Łódź
- County: Kutno
- Gmina: Kutno

Komadzyn [kɔˈmad͡zɨn] is a village in the administrative district of Gmina Kutno, within Kutno County, Łódź Voivodeship, in central Poland.
