= Klonowiec Wielki =

- Settlement
- Location within Poland
- Coordinates: 52°18′57″N 19°17′47″E
- Country: Poland
- Voivodeship: Łódź
- County: Kutno
- Gmina: Łanięta

Klonowiec Wielki (Polish pronunciation: [klɔˈnɔvjɛts ˈfjɛlkʲi]) is a settlement in the administrative district of Gmina Łanięta, within Kutno County, Łódź Voivodeship, in central Poland.
