= Rejmontów =

- Village
- Location within Poland
- Coordinates: 52°18′N 19°25′E
- Country: Poland
- Voivodeship: Łódź
- County: Kutno
- Gmina: Strzelce

Rejmontów [rɛi̯ˈmɔntuf] is a village in the administrative district of Gmina Strzelce, within Kutno County, Łódź Voivodeship, in central Poland.
