= Leszczynek =

- Village
- Location within Poland
- Coordinates: 52°12′3″N 19°19′15″E
- Country: Poland
- Voivodeship: Łódź
- County: Kutno
- Gmina: Kutno

Leszczynek [lɛʂˈt͡ʂɨnɛk] is a village in the administrative district of Gmina Kutno, within Kutno County, Łódź Voivodeship, in central Poland.
