= Grabków, Łódź Voivodeship =

Grabków
- Village
- Location within Poland
- Coordinates: 52°11′45″N 19°19′8″E
- Country: Poland
- Voivodeship: Łódź
- County: Kutno
- Gmina: Kutno

Grabków [ˈɡrapkuf] is a village in the administrative district of Gmina Kutno, within Kutno County, Łódź Voivodeship, in central Poland.
