= Żakowiec =

- Village
- Location within Poland
- Coordinates: 52°18′4″N 19°6′28″E
- Country: Poland
- Voivodeship: Łódź
- County: Kutno
- Gmina: Dąbrowice

Żakowiec [ʐaˈkɔvjɛt͡s] is a village in the administrative district of Gmina Dąbrowice, within Kutno County, Łódź Voivodeship, in central Poland.
