= Kalinowa, Kutno County =

Kalinowa
- Village
- Location within Poland
- Coordinates: 52°11′52″N 19°14′13″E
- Country: Poland
- Voivodeship: Łódź
- County: Kutno
- Gmina: Kutno

Kalinowa [kaliˈnɔva] is a village in the administrative district of Gmina Kutno, within Kutno County, Łódź Voivodeship, in central Poland.
