= Działy, Kutno County =

Działy
- Settlement
- Location within Poland
- Coordinates: 52°19′22″N 19°05′06″E
- Country: Poland
- Voivodeship: Łódź
- County: Kutno
- Gmina: Dąbrowice

Działy [ˈd͡ʑawɨ] is a settlement in the administrative district of Gmina Dąbrowice, within Kutno County, Łódź Voivodeship, in central Poland.
