= Kliny, Kutno County =

Kliny
- Settlement
- Location within Poland
- Coordinates: 52°20′26″N 19°18′49″E
- Country: Poland
- Voivodeship: Łódź
- County: Kutno
- Gmina: Łanięta

Kliny [ˈklinɨ] is a settlement in the administrative district of Gmina Łanięta, within Kutno County, Łódź Voivodeship, in central Poland.
