= Marianów Dolny =

- Village
- Location within Poland
- Coordinates: 52°17′11″N 19°27′23″E
- Country: Poland
- Voivodeship: Łódź
- County: Kutno
- Gmina: Strzelce
- Population: 80

Marianów Dolny [maˈrjanuf ˈdɔlnɨ] is a village in the administrative district of Gmina Strzelce, within Kutno County, Łódź Voivodeship, in central Poland.
