= Leszno, Kutno County =

Leszno
- Village
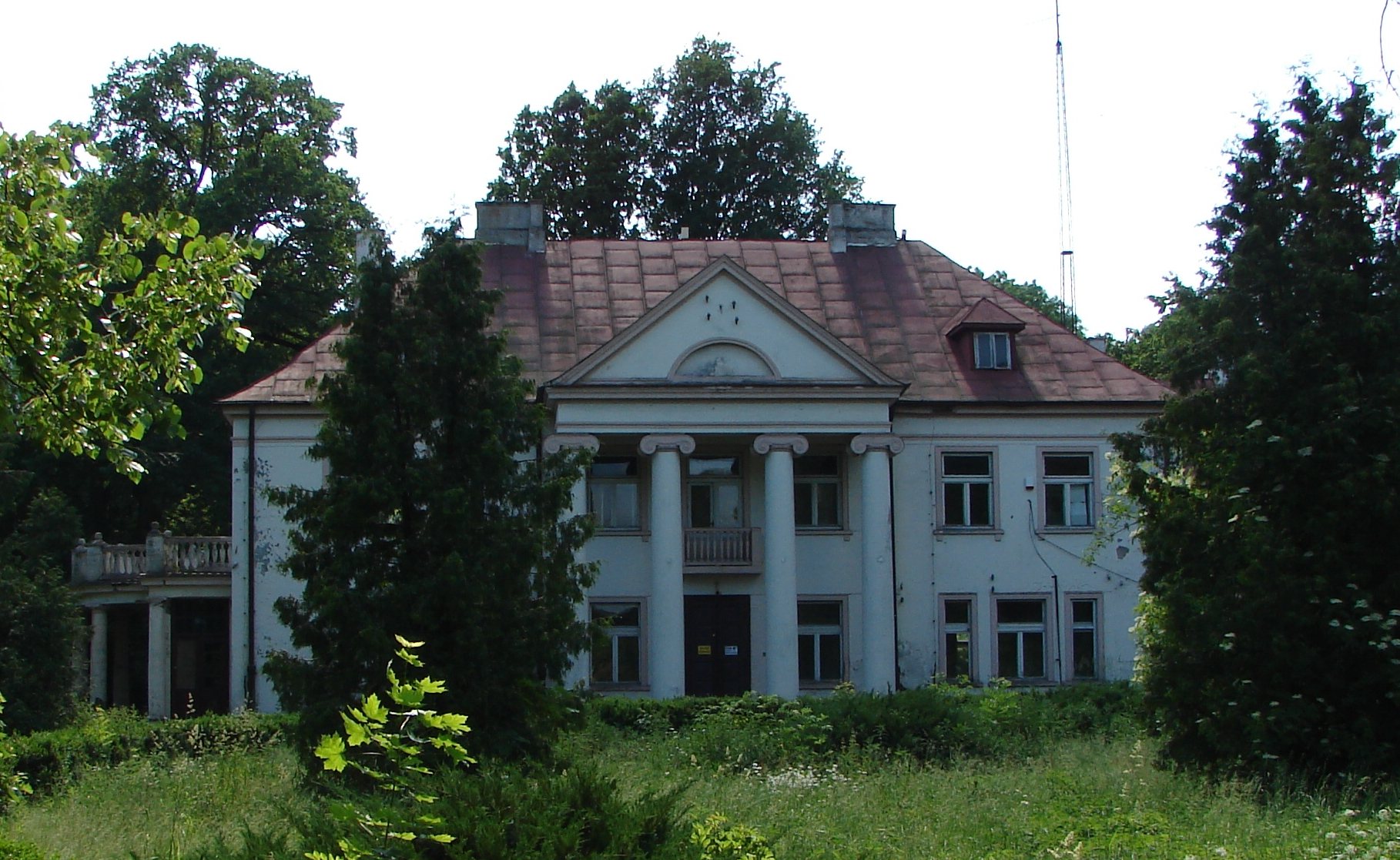
- The manor house, 19th century.

- Location within Poland
- Coordinates: 52°10′59″N 19°19′24″E
- Country: Poland
- Voivodeship: Łódź
- County: Kutno
- Gmina: Kutno
- Time zone: UTC+1 (CET)
  - Summer (DST): UTC+2 (CEST)
- Vehicle registration: EKU

Leszno [ˈlɛʂnɔ] is a village in the administrative district of Gmina Kutno, within Kutno County, Łódź Voivodeship, in central Poland.

== History ==
The village was granted by Archbishop of Gniezno Bogumilus to the Cistercians in the 12th century. In 1827, the village had a population of 287, which by the 1880s grew to 306.

During the German occupation of Poland (World War II), in 1941, the German gendarmerie carried out expulsions of Poles, whose houses and farms were then handed over to German colonists as part of the Lebensraum policy. Expelled Poles were enslaved as forced labour of new German colonists in the region.
