= Suchodębie, Łódź Voivodeship =

Suchodębie
- Village
- Location within Poland
- Coordinates: 52°20′16″N 19°17′1″E
- Country: Poland
- Voivodeship: Łódź
- County: Kutno
- Gmina: Łanięta

Suchodębie [suxɔˈdɛmbjɛ] is a village in the administrative district of Gmina Łanięta, within Kutno County, Łódź Voivodeship, in central Poland.
