= Ryszardów, Kutno County =

Ryszardów
- Village
- Location within Poland
- Coordinates: 52°20′55″N 19°14′13″E
- Country: Poland
- Voivodeship: Łódź
- County: Kutno
- Gmina: Łanięta
- Population: 60

Ryszardów [rɨˈʂarduf] is a village in the administrative district of Gmina Łanięta, within Kutno County, Łódź Voivodeship, in central Poland.
