= Stanisławów, Gmina Kutno =

Stanisławów
- Village
- Location within Poland
- Coordinates: 52°12′8″N 19°15′24″E
- Country: Poland
- Voivodeship: Łódź
- County: Kutno
- Gmina: Kutno

Stanisławów [staniˈswavuf] is a village in the administrative district of Gmina Kutno, within Kutno County, Łódź Voivodeship, in central Poland.
