= Marianów, Gmina Strzelce =

Marianów
- Village
- Location within Poland
- Coordinates: 52°16′35″N 19°27′24″E
- Country: Poland
- Voivodeship: Łódź
- County: Kutno
- Gmina: Strzelce

Marianów [maˈrjanuf] is a village in the administrative district of Gmina Strzelce, within Kutno County, Łódź Voivodeship, in central Poland.
