= Pomarzany =

Pomarzany may refer to the following places:

- Pomarzany, Greater Poland Voivodeship (west-central Poland)
- Pomarzany, Gmina Krośniewice in Łódź Voivodeship (central Poland)
- Pomarzany, Gmina Łanięta in Łódź Voivodeship (central Poland)
