= Byszew =

- Village
- Location within Poland
- Coordinates: 52°10′29″N 19°16′31″E
- Country: Poland
- Voivodeship: Łódź
- County: Kutno
- Gmina: Kutno

Population
  - Total: 410

Byszew [ˈbɨʂɛf] is a village in the administrative district of Gmina Kutno, within Kutno County, Łódź Voivodeship, in central Poland.
