= Majdany, Kutno County =

Majdany
- Settlement
- Location within Poland
- Coordinates: 52°19′23″N 19°5′39″E
- Country: Poland
- Voivodeship: Łódź
- County: Kutno
- Gmina: Dąbrowice

Majdany (Polish pronunciation: [majˈdanɨ]) is a settlement in the administrative district of Gmina Dąbrowice, within Kutno County, Łódź Voivodeship, in central Poland.
