= Kotliska =

Kotliska may refer to the following places in Poland:

- Kotliska, Lower Silesian Voivodeship (south-west Poland)
- Kotliska, Łódź Voivodeship (central Poland)
