= Bociany =

- Village
- Location within Poland
- Coordinates: 52°17′N 19°24′E
- Country: Poland
- Voivodeship: Łódź
- County: Kutno
- Gmina: Strzelce

Bociany [bɔˈt͡ɕanɨ] is a village in the administrative district of Gmina Strzelce, within Kutno County, Łódź Voivodeship, in central Poland.
