= Ostrówki, Łódź Voivodeship =

Ostrówki
- Village
- Location within Poland
- Coordinates: 52°17′13″N 19°7′22″E
- Country: Poland
- Voivodeship: Łódź
- County: Kutno
- Gmina: Dąbrowice

Ostrówki [ɔsˈtrufki] is a village in the administrative district of Gmina Dąbrowice, within Kutno County, Łódź Voivodeship, in central Poland.
