= Strzegocin, Łódź Voivodeship =

Strzegocin
- Village
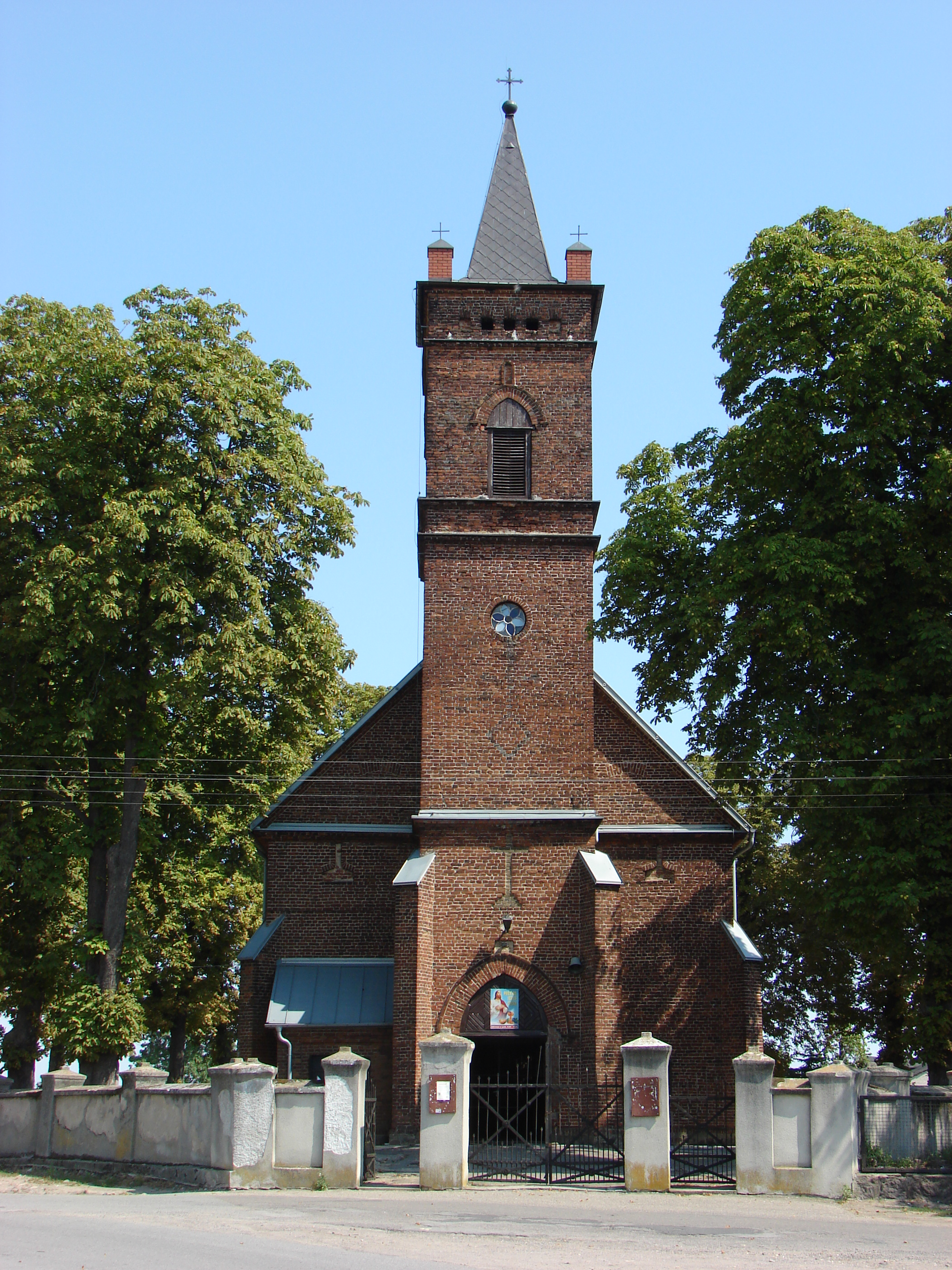
- Church of St. Bartholomew and St. Adalbert. 1866-1868.

- Location within Poland
- Coordinates: 52°9′30″N 19°21′16″E
- Country: Poland
- Voivodeship: Łódź
- County: Kutno
- Gmina: Kutno

Strzegocin [stʂɛˈɡɔt͡ɕin] is a village in the administrative district of Gmina Kutno, within Kutno County, Łódź Voivodeship, in central Poland.
