= Obidówek =

- Village
- Location within Poland
- Coordinates: 52°9′N 19°22′E
- Country: Poland
- Voivodeship: Łódź
- County: Kutno
- Gmina: Kutno

Obidówek [ɔbiˈduvɛk] is a village in the administrative district of Gmina Kutno, within Kutno County, Łódź Voivodeship, in central Poland.
