= Bielawy, Kutno County =

Bielawy
- Village
- Location within Poland
- Coordinates: 52°19′57″N 19°23′57″E
- Country: Poland
- Voivodeship: Łódź
- County: Kutno
- Gmina: Strzelce

Population
  - Total: 30
- Postal code: 99-307
- Vehicle registration: EKU

Bielawy [bjɛˈlavɨ] is a village in the administrative district of Gmina Strzelce, within Kutno County, Łódź Voivodeship, in central Poland.
