= Nowy Gołębiewek =

- Village
- Location within Poland
- Coordinates: 52°15′6″N 19°18′27″E
- Country: Poland
- Voivodeship: Łódź
- County: Kutno
- Gmina: Kutno

Nowy Gołębiewek [ˈnɔvɨ ɡɔwɛmˈbjɛvɛk] is a village in the administrative district of Gmina Kutno, within Kutno County, Łódź Voivodeship, in central Poland.
