= Stare Budy =

Stare Budy may refer to the following places:

- Stare Budy, Łódź Voivodeship (central Poland)
- Stare Budy, Gmina Jaktorów, Grodzisk County in Masovian Voivodeship (east-central Poland)
- Stare Budy, Sochaczew County in Masovian Voivodeship (east-central Poland)
- Stare Budy, Wyszków County in Masovian Voivodeship (east-central Poland)
- Stare Budy, Greater Poland Voivodeship (west-central Poland)
