= Chruścinek =

Village in Gmina Łanięta, Poland

- Village
- Location within Poland
- Coordinates: 52°17′38″N 19°17′26″E
- Country: Poland
- Voivodeship: Łódź
- County: Kutno
- Gmina: Łanięta

Chruścinek [xruɕˈt͡ɕinɛk] is a village in the administrative district of Gmina Łanięta, within Kutno County, Łódź Voivodeship, in central Poland.
