= Juków =

- Village
- Location within Poland
- Coordinates: 52°21′47″N 19°19′6″E
- Country: Poland
- Voivodeship: Łódź
- County: Kutno
- Gmina: Łanięta

Juków [ˈjukuf] is a village in the administrative district of Gmina Łanięta, within Kutno County, Łódź Voivodeship, in central Poland.
