= Wierzbie, Łódź Voivodeship =

Wierzbie
- Village
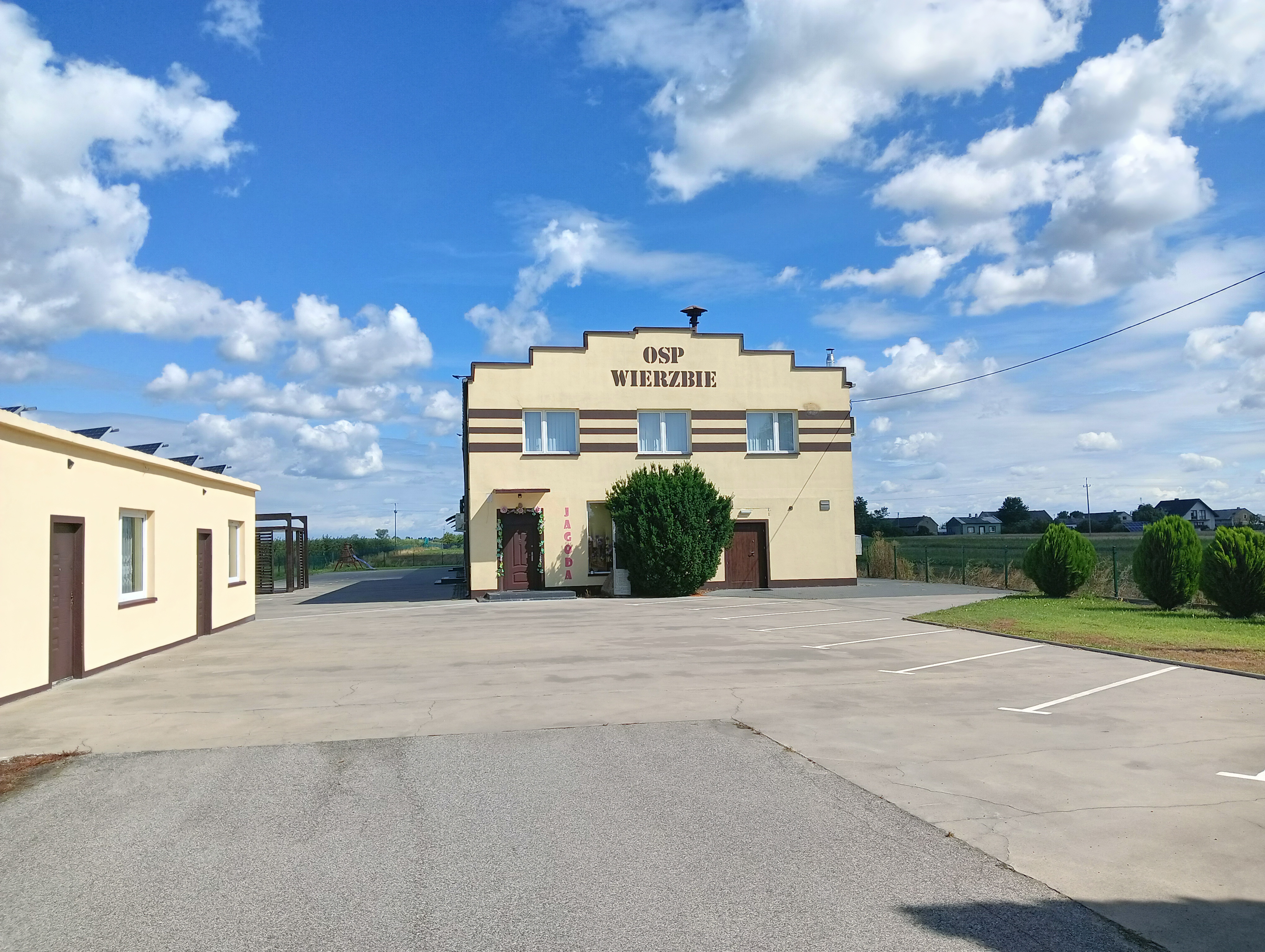
- Fire station

- Location within Poland
- Coordinates: 52°15′26″N 19°24′29″E
- Country: Poland
- Voivodeship: Łódź
- County: Kutno
- Gmina: Kutno

Wierzbie [ˈvjɛʐbjɛ] is a village in the administrative district of Gmina Kutno, within Kutno County, Łódź Voivodeship, in central Poland.
