= Pomarzany, Gmina Łanięta =

Pomarzany
- Village
- Location within Poland
- Coordinates: 52°22′54″N 19°17′45″E
- Country: Poland
- Voivodeship: Łódź
- County: Kutno
- Gmina: Łanięta

Pomarzany [pɔmaˈʐanɨ] is a village in the administrative district of Gmina Łanięta, within Kutno County, Łódź Voivodeship, in central Poland.
