= Janiszew, Łódź Voivodeship =

Janiszew
- Village
- Location within Poland
- Coordinates: 52°16′N 19°26′E
- Country: Poland
- Voivodeship: Łódź
- County: Kutno
- Gmina: Strzelce
- Population: 50

Janiszew [jaˈniʂɛf] is a village in the administrative district of Gmina Strzelce, within Kutno County, Łódź Voivodeship, in central Poland.
