= Zgórze, Gmina Strzelce =

Zgórze
- Village
- Location within Poland
- Coordinates: 52°19′7″N 19°22′4″E
- Country: Poland
- Voivodeship: Łódź
- County: Kutno
- Gmina: Strzelce
- Population: 60

Zgórze [ˈzɡuʐɛ] is a village in the administrative district of Gmina Strzelce, within Kutno County, Łódź Voivodeship, in central Poland.

The A1 motorway and the Kutno–Brodnica railway pass through the village, and the Strzelce Kujawskie railway station is just north of the village.
