= Stare Budy, Łódź Voivodeship =

Stare Budy
- Village
- Location within Poland
- Coordinates: 52°21′24″N 19°14′39″E
- Country: Poland
- Voivodeship: Łódź
- County: Kutno
- Gmina: Łanięta
- Population: 120

Stare Budy [ˈstarɛ ˈbudɨ] is a village in the administrative district of Gmina Łanięta, within Kutno County, Łódź Voivodeship, in central Poland.
