= Gmina Strzelce =

Gmina Strzelce Strzelce Commune
- Gmina
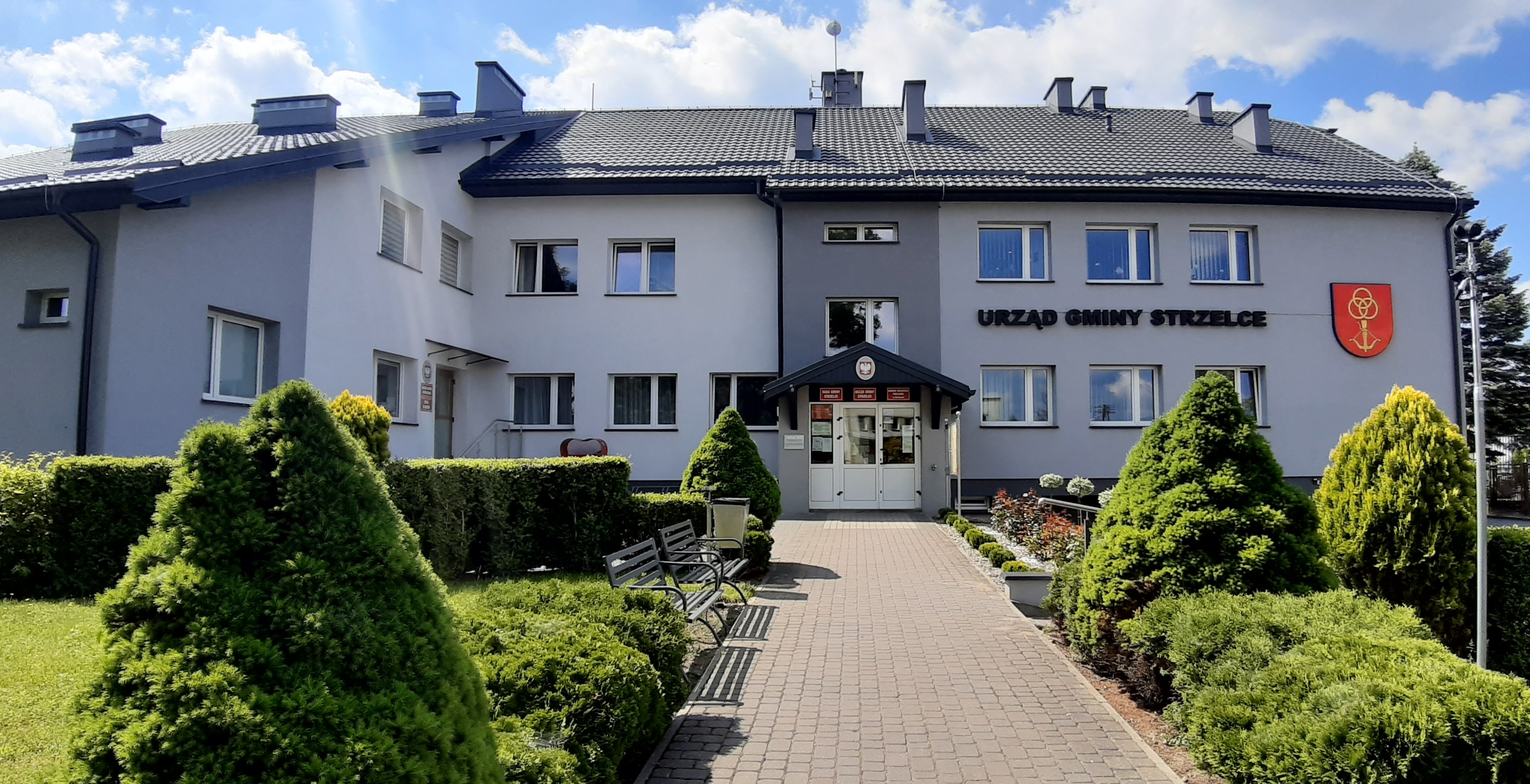
- Municipal hall

- Coat of arms
- Interactive map of Gmina Strzelce
- Coordinates (Strzelce): 52°18′41″N 19°24′22″E
- Country: Poland
- Voivodeship: Łódź
- County: Kutno
- Seat: Strzelce

Area
  - Total: 90.11 km^{2} (34.79 sq mi)

Population (2006)
  - Total: 4,178
  - Density: 46.37/km^{2} (120.1/sq mi)
- Website: www.strzelce.gmina.pl

Gmina Strzelce is a rural gmina (administrative district) in Kutno County, Łódź Voivodeship, in central Poland. Its seat is the village of Strzelce, which lies 10 kilometres (6 mi) north of Kutno and 59 km (37 mi) north of the regional capital Łódź.

The gmina covers an area of 90.11 square kilometres (34.8 sq mi), and as of 2006 its total population was 4,178.

== Villages ==
Gmina Strzelce contains the villages and settlements of:

- Aleksandrów
- Bielawy
- Bociany
- Dąbkowice
- Dębina
- Długołęka
- Glinice
- Holendry Strzeleckie
- Janiszew
- Karolew
- Klonowiec Stary
- Kozia Góra
- Marianka
- Marianów
- Marianów Dolny
- Muchnice
- Muchnice Nowe
- Muchnów
- Niedrzaków
- Niedrzakówek
- Niedrzew Drugi
- Niedrzew Pierwszy
- Nowa Kozia Góra
- Przyzórz
- Rejmontów
- Siemianów
- Sójki
- Sójki-Parcel
- Strzelce
- Wieszczyce
- Wola Raciborowska
- Zaranna
- Zgórze

== Neighbouring gminas ==
Gmina Strzelce is bordered by the gminas of Gostynin, Kutno, Łanięta, Oporów and Szczawin Kościelny.
