= Adamowice, Łódź Voivodeship =

Adamowice
- Village
- Location within Poland
- Coordinates: 52°14′6″N 19°18′14″E
- Country: Poland
- Voivodeship: Łódź
- County: Kutno
- Gmina: Kutno
- Population: 210

Adamowice [adamɔˈvit͡sɛ] is a village in the administrative district of Gmina Kutno, within Kutno County, Łódź Voivodeship, in central Poland.
