= Nowe Budy, Łódź Voivodeship =

Nowe Budy
- Village
- Location within Poland
- Coordinates: 52°21′46″N 19°14′44″E
- Country: Poland
- Voivodeship: Łódź
- County: Kutno
- Gmina: Łanięta

Nowe Budy [ˈnɔvɛ ˈbudɨ] is a village in the administrative district of Gmina Łanięta, within Kutno County, Łódź Voivodeship, in central Poland.
