= Łanięta, Łódź Voivodeship =

Łanięta
- Village
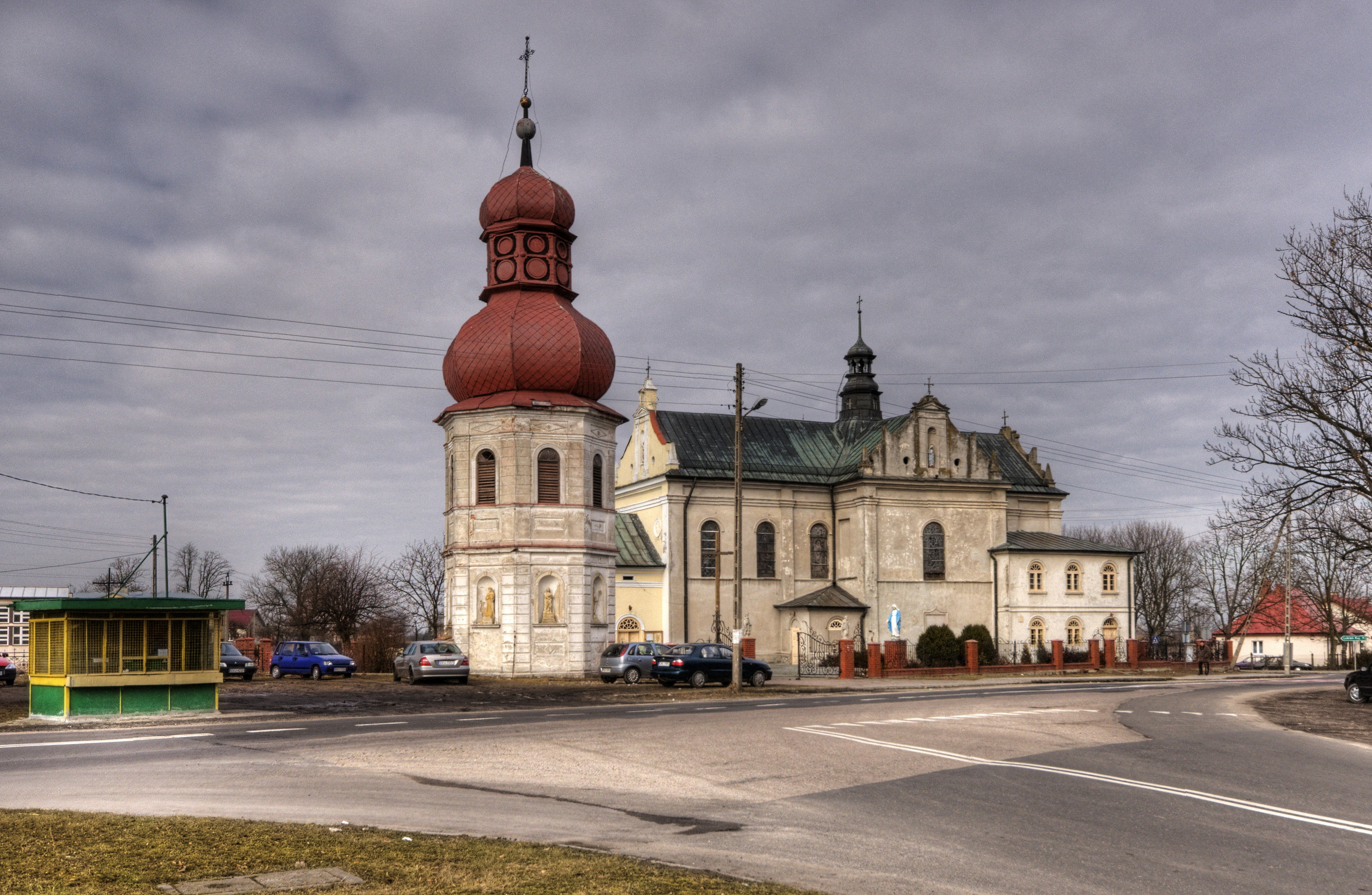
- Ascension of Virgin Mary Church

- Location within Poland
- Coordinates: 52°21′N 19°16′E
- Country: Poland
- Voivodeship: Łódź
- County: Kutno
- Gmina: Łanięta

Łanięta [waˈɲɛnta] is a village in Kutno County, Łódź Voivodeship located in central Poland. It is the seat of the gmina or the administrative district called Gmina Łanięta.
