= Strzelce, Kutno County =

Strzelce
- Village
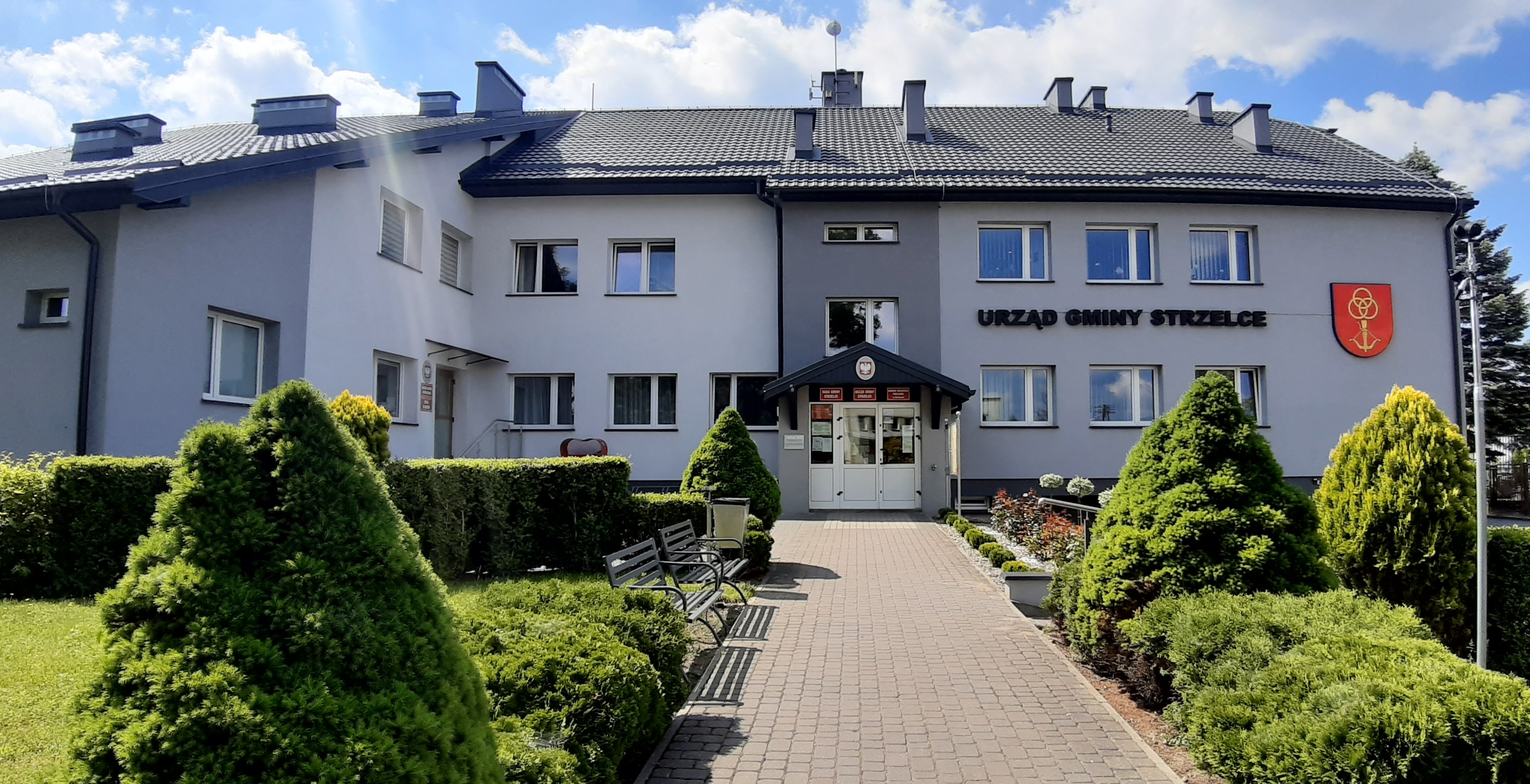
- Gmina office

- Location within Poland
- Coordinates: 52°18′41″N 19°24′22″E
- Country: Poland
- Voivodeship: Łódź
- County: Kutno
- Gmina: Strzelce

Strzelce [ˈstʂɛlt͡sɛ] is a village in Kutno County, Łódź Voivodeship, in central Poland. It is the seat of the gmina (administrative district) called Gmina Strzelce.
