= Kozia Góra, Łódź Voivodeship =

Kozia Góra
- Village
- Location within Poland
- Coordinates: 52°20′3″N 19°25′45″E
- Country: Poland
- Voivodeship: Łódź
- County: Kutno
- Gmina: Strzelce

Kozia Góra [ˈkɔʑa ˈɡura] is a village in the administrative district of Gmina Strzelce, within Kutno County, Łódź Voivodeship, in central Poland.
