= Gmina Dąbrowice =

Gmina Dąbrowice Dąbrowice Commune
- Gmina
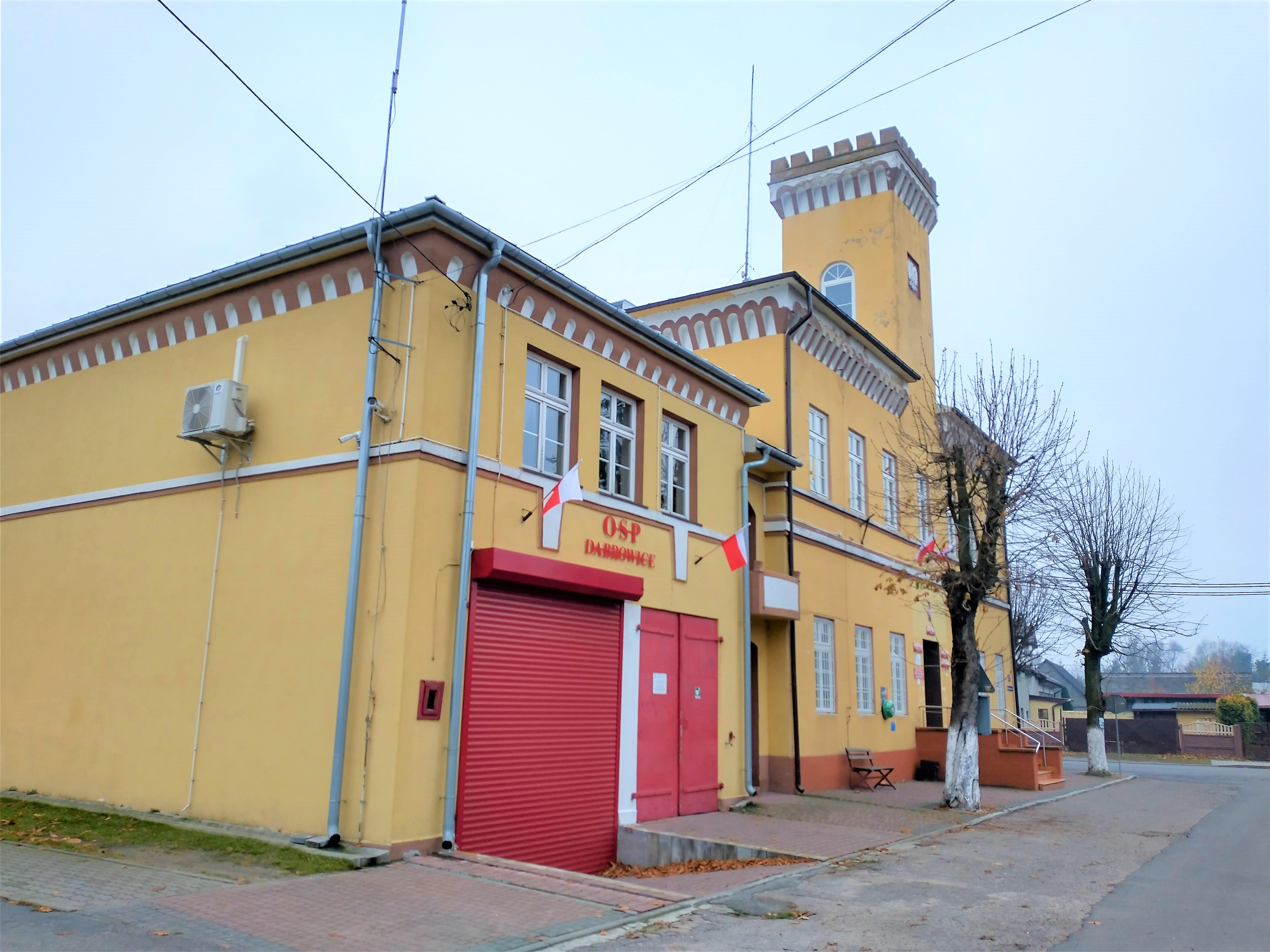
- Interactive map of Gmina Dąbrowice
- Coordinates (Dąbrowice): 52°18′49″N 19°5′2″E
- Country: Poland
- Voivodeship: Łódź
- County: Kutno
- Seat: Dąbrowice

Area
  - Total: 45.94 km^{2} (17.74 sq mi)

Population (2006)
  - Total: 2,094
  - Density: 45.58/km^{2} (118.1/sq mi)
- Time zone: UTC+1 (CET)
  - Summer (DST): UTC+2 (CEST)
- Website: www.dabrowice.pl

Gmina Dąbrowice is a rural gmina (administrative district) in Kutno County, Łódź Voivodeship, in central Poland. Its seat is the village of Dąbrowice, which lies 22 kilometres (14 mi) north-west of Kutno and 65 km (40 mi) north-west of the regional capital Łódź.

The gmina covers an area of 45.94 square kilometres (17.7 sq mi), and as of 2006 its total population was 2,094.

== Villages ==
Gmina Dąbrowice contains the villages and settlements of:

- Augustopol
- Baby
- Baby-Towarzystwo
- Cieleburzyna
- Dąbrowice
- Działy
- Dzięgost
- Iwiny
- Liliopol
- Łojewka
- Majdany
- Mariopol
- Ostrówki
- Piotrowo
- Rozopol
- Witawa
- Żakowiec
- Zgórze

== Neighbouring gminas ==
Gmina Dąbrowice is bordered by the gminas of Chodecz, Chodów, Krośniewice, Nowe Ostrowy and Przedecz.
