= Siemianów, Łódź Voivodeship =

Siemianów
- Village
- Location within Poland
- Coordinates: 52°19′15″N 19°19′44″E
- Country: Poland
- Voivodeship: Łódź
- County: Kutno
- Gmina: Strzelce

Siemianów [ɕɛˈmjanuf] is a village in the administrative district of Gmina Strzelce, within Kutno County, Łódź Voivodeship, in central Poland.
