= Dąbkowice, Łódź Voivodeship =

Dąbkowice
- Village
- Location within Poland
- Coordinates: 52°18′27″N 19°29′37″E
- Country: Poland
- Voivodeship: Łódź
- County: Kutno
- Gmina: Strzelce

Dąbkowice [dɔmpkɔˈvit͡sɛ] is a village in the administrative district of Gmina Strzelce, within Kutno County, Łódź Voivodeship, in central Poland.
