= Gmina Kutno =

Gmina Kutno Kutno Commune
- Gmina
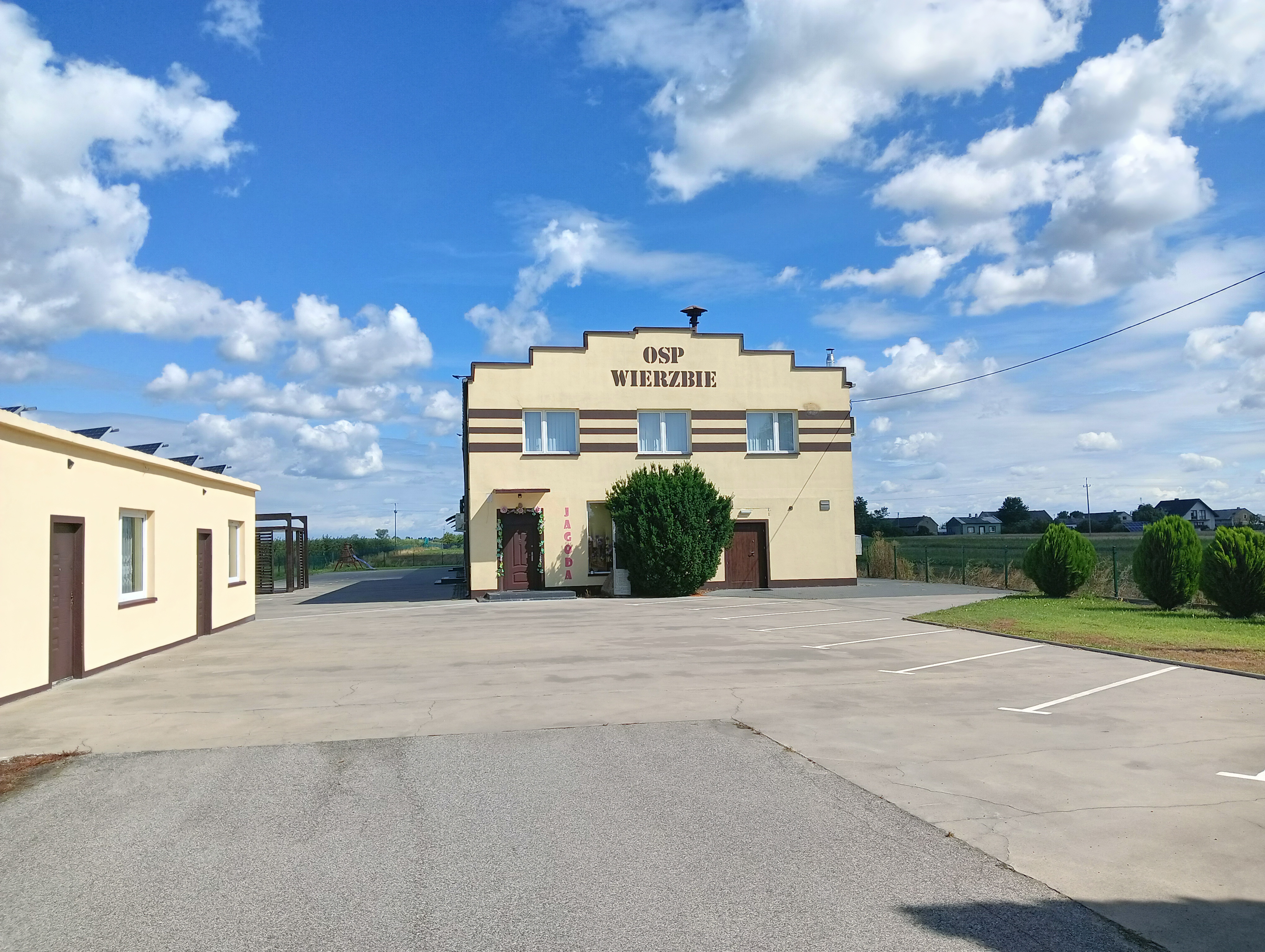

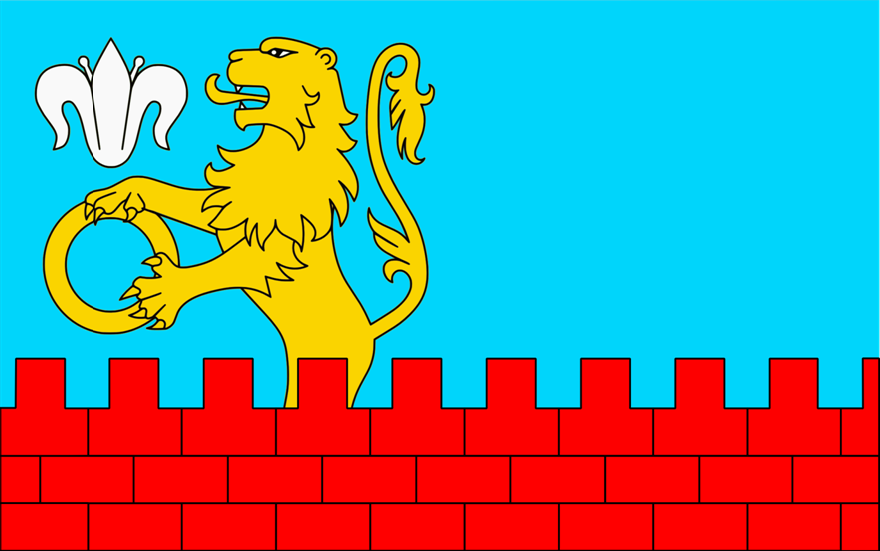
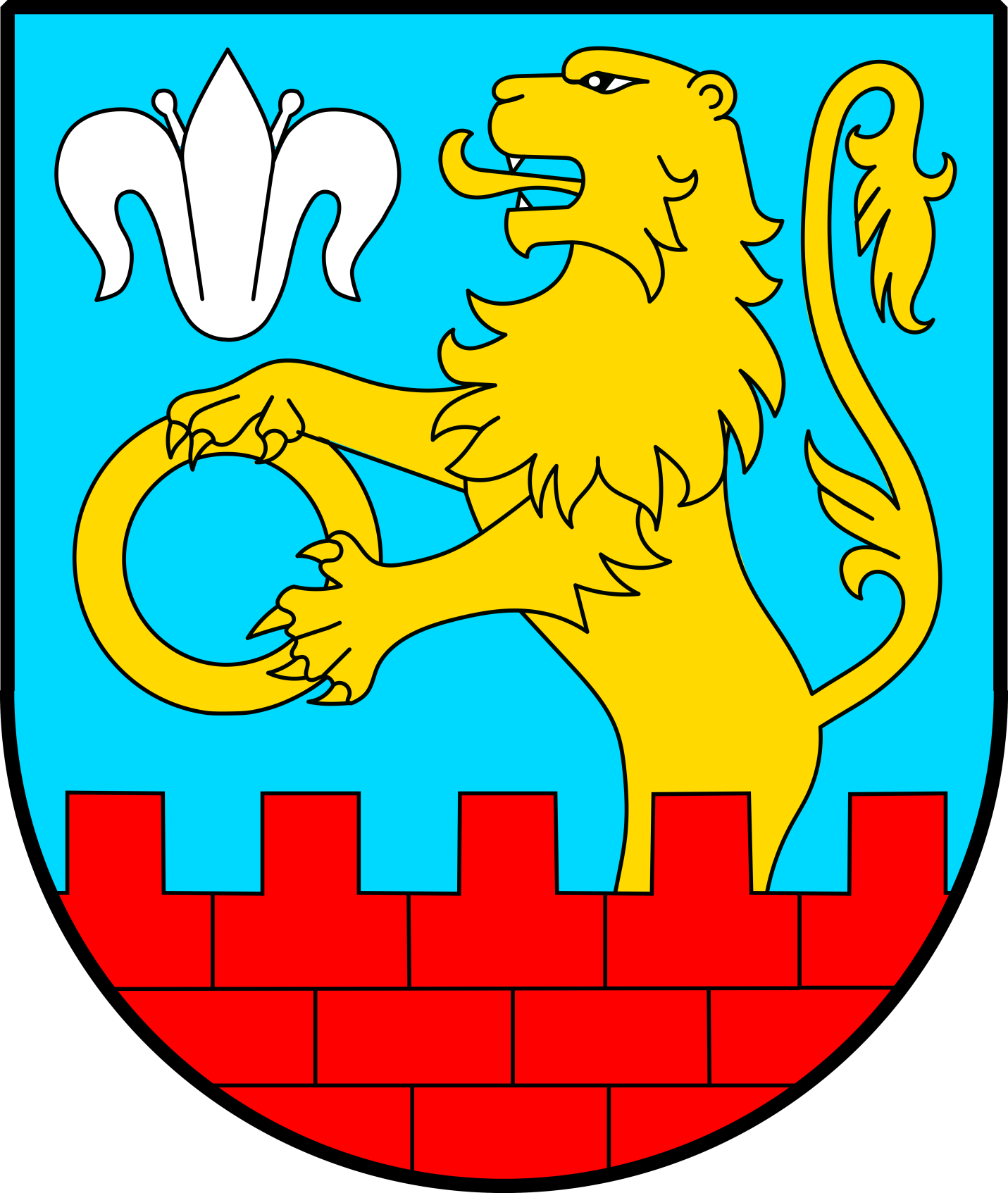
- Flag Coat of arms
- Interactive map of Gmina Kutno
- Coordinates (Kutno): 52°14′N 19°22′E
- Country: Poland
- Voivodeship: Łódź
- County: Kutno
- Seat: Kutno

Area
  - Total: 122.33 km^{2} (47.23 sq mi)

Population (2006)
  - Total: 8,357
  - Density: 68.32/km^{2} (176.9/sq mi)
- Time zone: UTC+1 (CET)
  - Summer (DST): UTC+2 (CEST)
- Website: gminakutno.pl

Gmina Kutno is a rural gmina (administrative district) in Kutno County, Łódź Voivodeship, in central Poland. Its seat is the town of Kutno, although the town is not part of the territory of the gmina.

The gmina covers an area of 122.33 square kilometres (47.2 sq mi), and as of 2006 had a population of 8,357.

== Villages ==
Gmina Kutno contains the villages and settlements of:

- Adamów
- Adamowice
- Bielawki
- Boża Wola
- Byszew
- Byszew-Kaczyn
- Dębina
- Dudki
- Florek
- Franki Wroczyńskie
- Głogowiec
- Gnojno
- Grabków
- Julinki
- Kalinowa
- Kolonia Sójki
- Kolonia Strzegocin
- Komadzyn
- Kotliska
- Krzesin
- Krzesin-Parcel
- Krzesinówek
- Kuczków
- Leszczynek
- Leszno
- Malina
- Marianki
- Michałów
- Nagodów
- Nowa Wieś
- Nowe Sójki
- Nowy Gołębiew
- Nowy Gołębiewek
- Obidówek
- Piwki
- Podczachy
- Raciborów
- Ryków
- Sieciechów
- Siemiennik
- Sieraków
- Stanisławów
- Stara Wieś
- Stary Gołębiew
- Stary Gołębiewek
- Strzegocin
- Wierzbie
- Włosków
- Woźniaków
- Wroczyny
- Wysoka Duża
- Wysoka Wielka
- Żurawieniec

== Neighbouring gminas ==
Gmina Kutno is bordered by the town of Kutno and by the gminas of Daszyna, Krośniewice, Krzyżanów, Łanięta, Nowe Ostrowy, Oporów, Strzelce and Witonia.
