= Marianki, Łódź Voivodeship =

Marianki
- Village
- Location within Poland
- Coordinates: 52°12′1″N 19°17′40″E
- Country: Poland
- Voivodeship: Łódź
- County: Kutno
- Gmina: Kutno

Marianki [maˈrjaŋki] is a village in the administrative district of Gmina Kutno, within Kutno County, Łódź Voivodeship, in central Poland.
