= Kotliska, Łódź Voivodeship =

Kotliska
- Village
- Location within Poland
- Coordinates: 52°13′32″N 19°26′55″E
- Country: Poland
- Voivodeship: Łódź
- County: Kutno
- Gmina: Kutno

Kotliska [kɔˈtliska] is a village in the administrative district of Gmina Kutno, within Kutno County, Łódź Voivodeship, in central Poland.
