= Bielawki, Łódź Voivodeship =

Bielawki
- Village
- Location within Poland
- Coordinates: 52°13′50″N 19°25′1″E
- Country: Poland
- Voivodeship: Łódź
- County: Kutno
- Gmina: Kutno
- Population (approx.): 200

Bielawki [bjɛˈlafki] is a village in the administrative district of Gmina Kutno, within Kutno County, Łódź Voivodeship, in central Poland.

The village has an approximate population of 200.
