= Krzesin, Łódź Voivodeship =

Krzesin
- Village
- Location within Poland
- Coordinates: 52°14′50″N 19°17′24″E
- Country: Poland
- Voivodeship: Łódź
- County: Kutno
- Gmina: Kutno

Krzesin [ˈkʂɛɕin] is a village in the administrative district of Gmina Kutno, within Kutno County, Łódź Voivodeship, in central Poland.
