= Gnojno, Łódź Voivodeship =

Gnojno
- Village
- Location within Poland
- Coordinates: 52°13′15″N 19°17′10″E
- Country: Poland
- Voivodeship: Łódź
- County: Kutno
- Gmina: Kutno

Gnojno [ˈɡnɔi̯nɔ] is a village in the administrative district of Gmina Kutno, within Kutno County, Łódź Voivodeship, in central Poland.
