= Zgórze, Gmina Dąbrowice =

Zgórze
- Village
- Location within Poland
- Coordinates: 52°16′52″N 19°05′13″E
- Country: Poland
- Voivodeship: Łódź
- County: Kutno
- Gmina: Dąbrowice
- Elevation: 123 m (404 ft)

Zgórze [ˈzɡuʐɛ] is a village in the administrative district of Gmina Dąbrowice, within Kutno County, Łódź Voivodeship, in central Poland.

Zgórze was a royal estate village (Kłodawski starosty) colonised by the Dutch settlers in 1782, with 12 houses by 1790. The village had an Evangelical house of prayer, school and cemetery.
