= Podczachy, Łódź Voivodeship =

Podczachy
- Village
- Location within Poland
- Coordinates: 52°14′1″N 19°16′30″E
- Country: Poland
- Voivodeship: Łódź
- County: Kutno
- Gmina: Kutno

Podczachy [pɔtˈt͡ʂaxɨ] is a village in the administrative district of Gmina Kutno, within Kutno County, Łódź Voivodeship, in central Poland.
