= Dąbrowice, Kutno County =

Town in Kutno County, Łódź Voivodeship, Poland

Dąbrowice
- Town
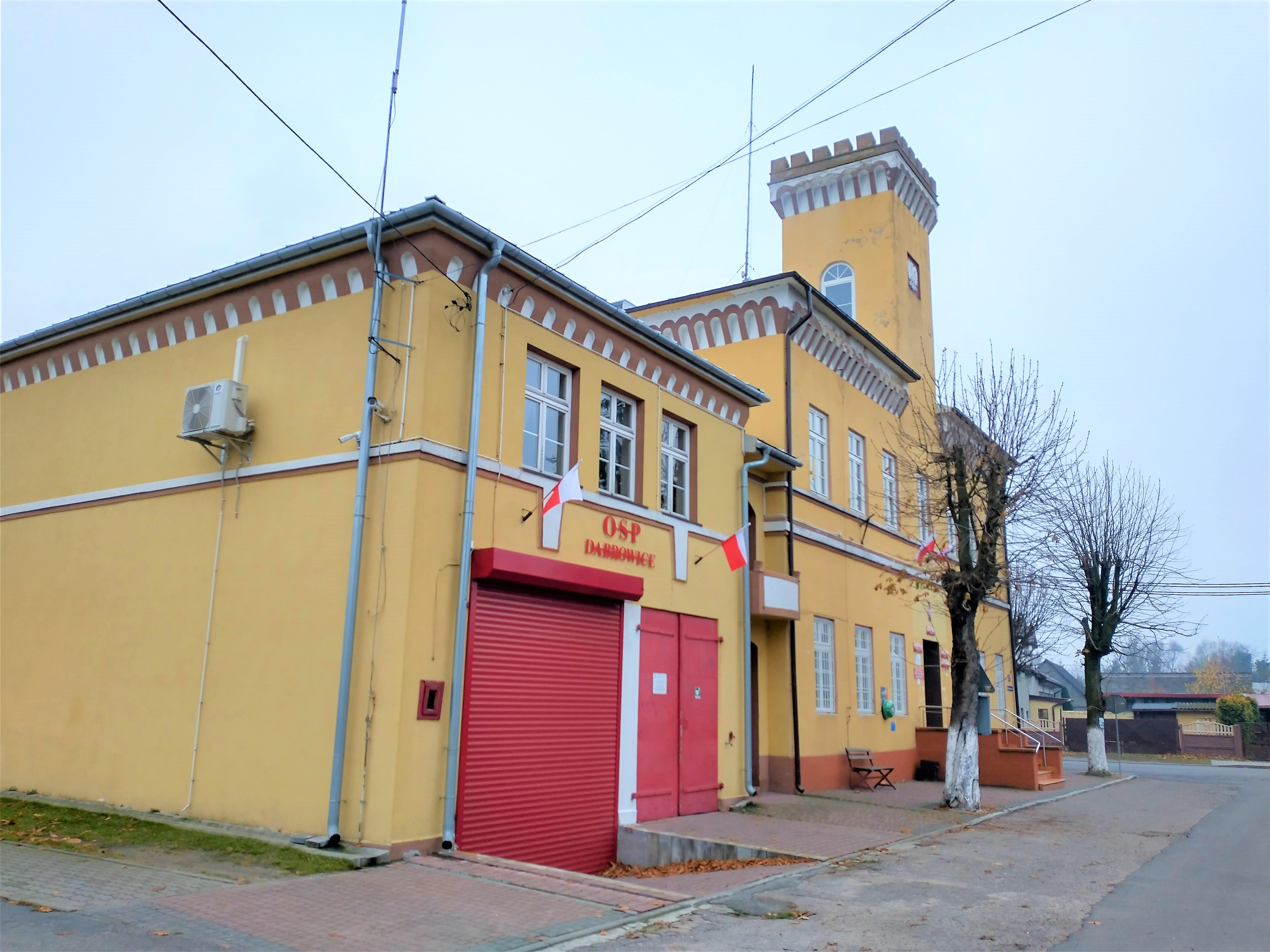
- Town hall

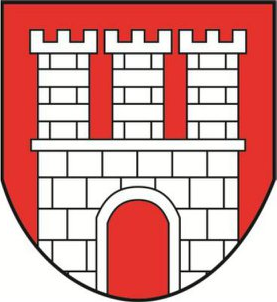
- Coat of arms

- Location within Poland
- Coordinates: 52°18′49″N 19°5′2″E
- Country: Poland
- Voivodeship: Łódź
- County: Kutno
- Gmina: Dąbrowice

Population
  - Total: 1,300
- Time zone: UTC+1 (CET)
  - Summer (DST): UTC+2 (CEST)
- Postal code: 99-352
- Vehicle registration: EKU

Dąbrowice [dɔmbrɔˈvit͡sɛ] is a town in Kutno County, Łódź Voivodeship, in central Poland. It is the seat of the gmina (administrative district) called Gmina Dąbrowice. It lies approximately 22 km (14 mi) north-west of Kutno and 65 km (40 mi) north-west of the regional capital Łódź. It is located within the historic Łęczyca Land.

== History ==
Dąbrowice was a royal town, administratively located in the Łęczyca County in the Łęczyca Voivodeship in the Greater Poland Province of the Kingdom of Poland.

In the interwar period, it was administratively located in the Kutno County in the Warsaw Voivodeship of Poland. According to the 1921 census, it had a population of 2,349, 92.6% Polish and 6.9% Jewish.

== Notable people ==
- Wojciech Nierychlewski (1903–1942), Polish priest murdered in the Auschwitz concentration camp, Blessed of the Catholic Church
