= Iwiny, Łódź Voivodeship =

Iwiny
- Village
- Location within Poland
- Coordinates: 52°17′17″N 19°5′59″E
- Country: Poland
- Voivodeship: Łódź
- County: Kutno
- Gmina: Dąbrowice
- Population: 40

Iwiny [iˈvinɨ] is a village in the administrative district of Gmina Dąbrowice, within Kutno County, Łódź Voivodeship, in central Poland.
