= Gmina Łanięta =

Gmina Łanięta Łanięta Commune
- Gmina
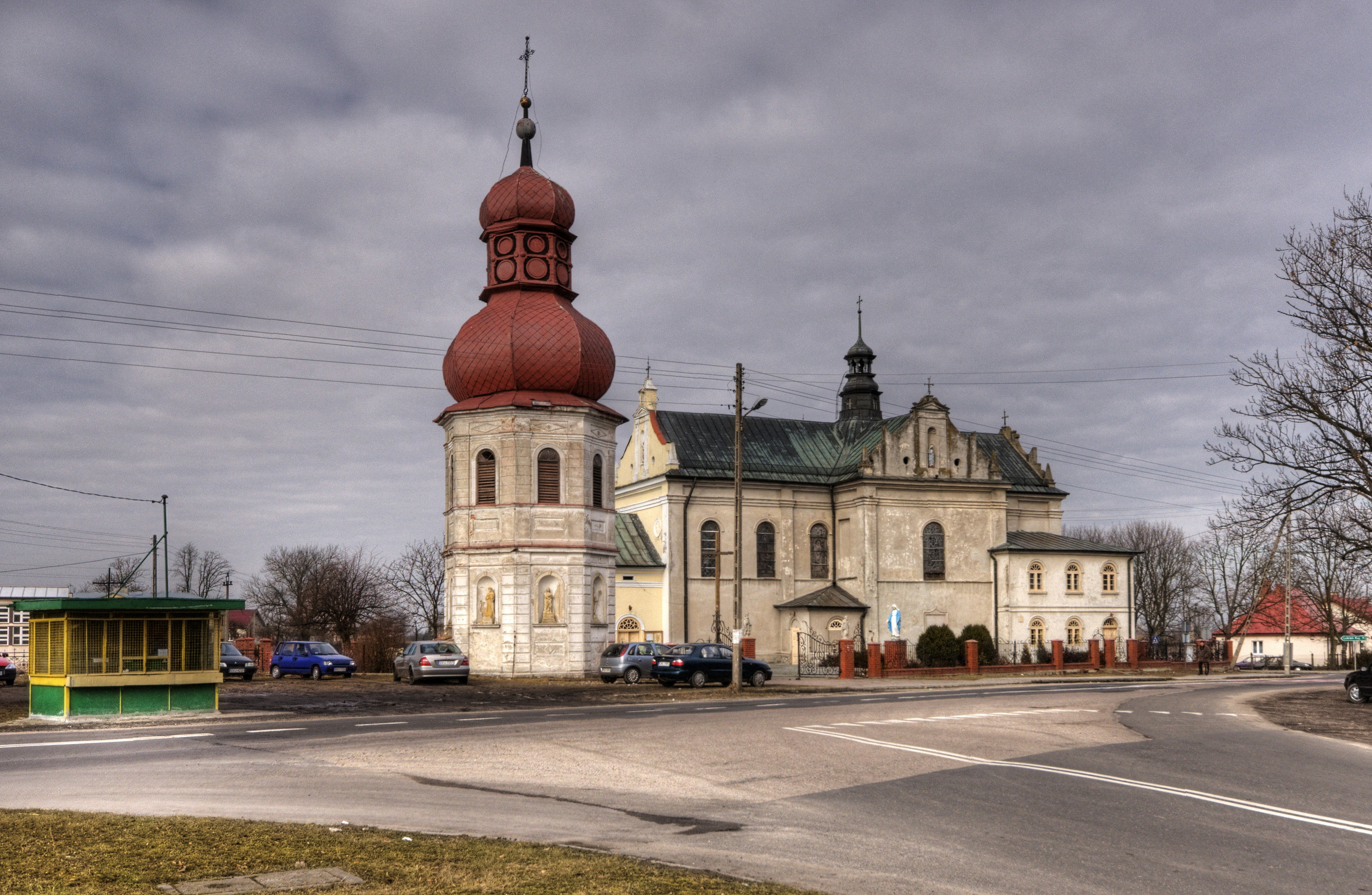
- Interactive map of Gmina Łanięta
- Coordinates (Łanięta): 52°21′N 19°16′E
- Country: Poland
- Voivodeship: Łódź
- County: Kutno
- Seat: Łanięta

Area
  - Total: 54.76 km^{2} (21.14 sq mi)

Population (2006)
  - Total: 2,673
  - Density: 48.81/km^{2} (126.4/sq mi)
- Website: gminalanieta.pl

Gmina Łanięta is a rural gmina (administrative district) in Kutno County, Łódź Voivodeship, in central Poland. Its seat is the village of Łanięta, which lies approximately 15 kilometres (9 mi) north-west of Kutno and 65 km (40 mi) north of the regional capital Łódź.

The gmina covers an area of 54.76 square kilometres (21.1 sq mi), and the total population of Gmina Łanięta was 2,673, as of 2006.

== Villages ==
Gmina Łanięta contains the villages and settlements of:

- Anielin
- Bronisławów
- Chrosno
- Chruścinek
- Franciszków
- Juków
- Kąty
- Kliny
- Klonowiec Wielki
- Łanięta
- Lipie
- Marianów
- Nowe Budy
- Nutowo
- Pomarzany
- Rajmundów
- Ryszardów
- Stare Budy
- Suchodębie
- Suchodębie PGR
- Świecinki
- Świeciny
- Wilkowia
- Witoldów
- Wola Chruścińska
- Zgoda

== Neighbouring gminas ==
Gmina Łanięta is bordered by the gminas of Gostynin, Kutno, Lubień Kujawski, Nowe Ostrowy and Strzelce.
