= Kozia Góra, Stargard County =

Kozia Góra
- Hamlet
- Location within Poland Location within West Pomeranian Voivodeship
- Coordinates: 53°24′11″N 15°30′07″E
- Country: Poland
- Voivodeship: West Pomeranian
- County: Stargard
- Gmina: Ińsko
- Time zone: UTC+1 (CET)
  - Summer (DST): UTC+2 (CEST)
- Postal code: 73-140
- Area code: +48 91

Kozia Góra (Polish: [ˈkɔʑa ˈɡura]) is a hamlet in the West Pomeranian Voivodeship, Poland, located within the Gmina Ińsko, Stargard County.
