= Adamowice, Silesian Voivodeship =

Adamowice
- Village
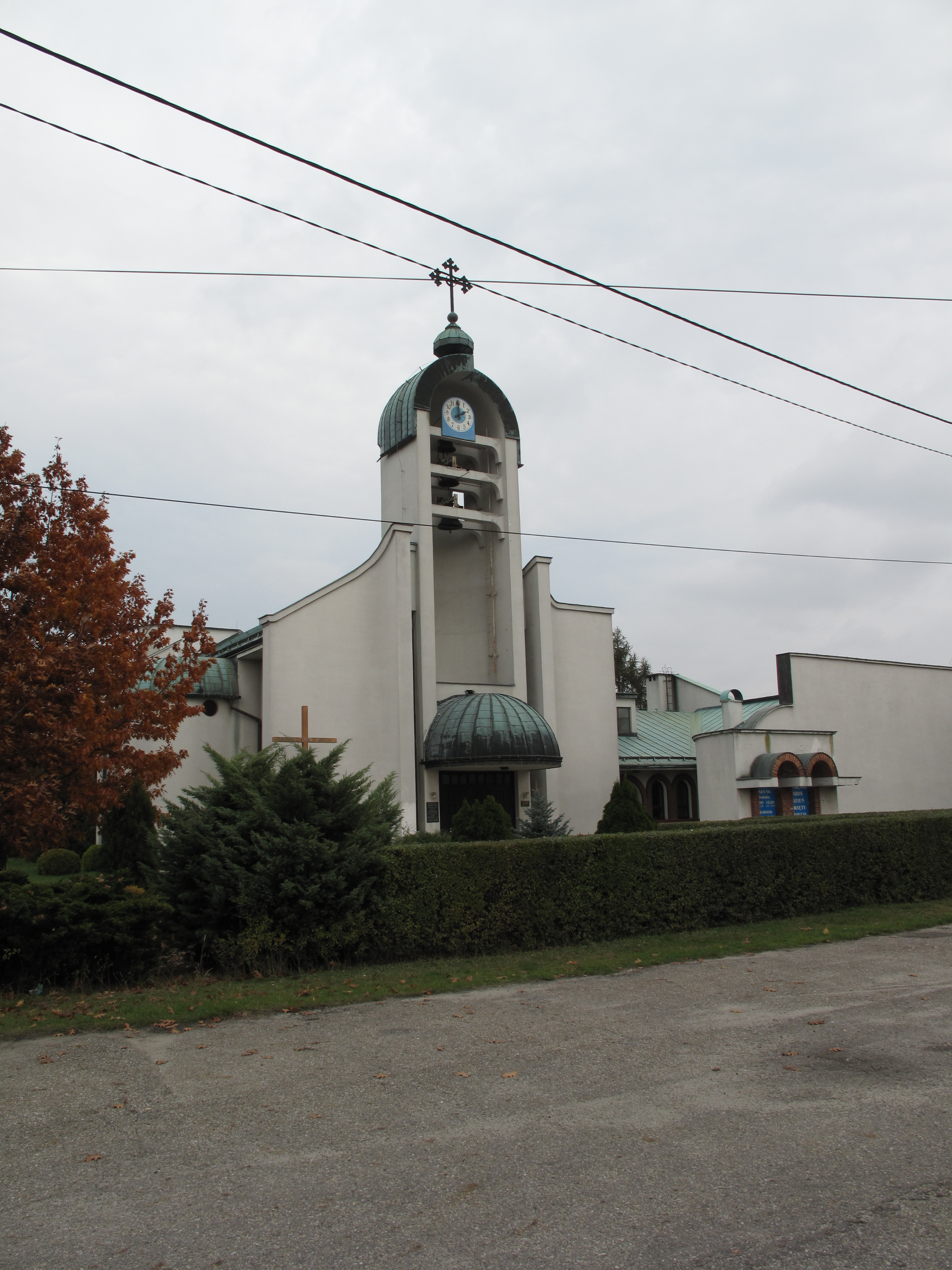
- Church

- Location within Poland
- Coordinates: 50°7′49″N 18°19′58″E
- Country: Poland
- Voivodeship: Silesian
- County: Rybnik
- Gmina: Lyski

Adamowice [adamɔˈvit͡sɛ] is a village in the administrative district of Gmina Lyski, within Rybnik County, Silesian Voivodeship, in southern Poland.

== Gallery ==
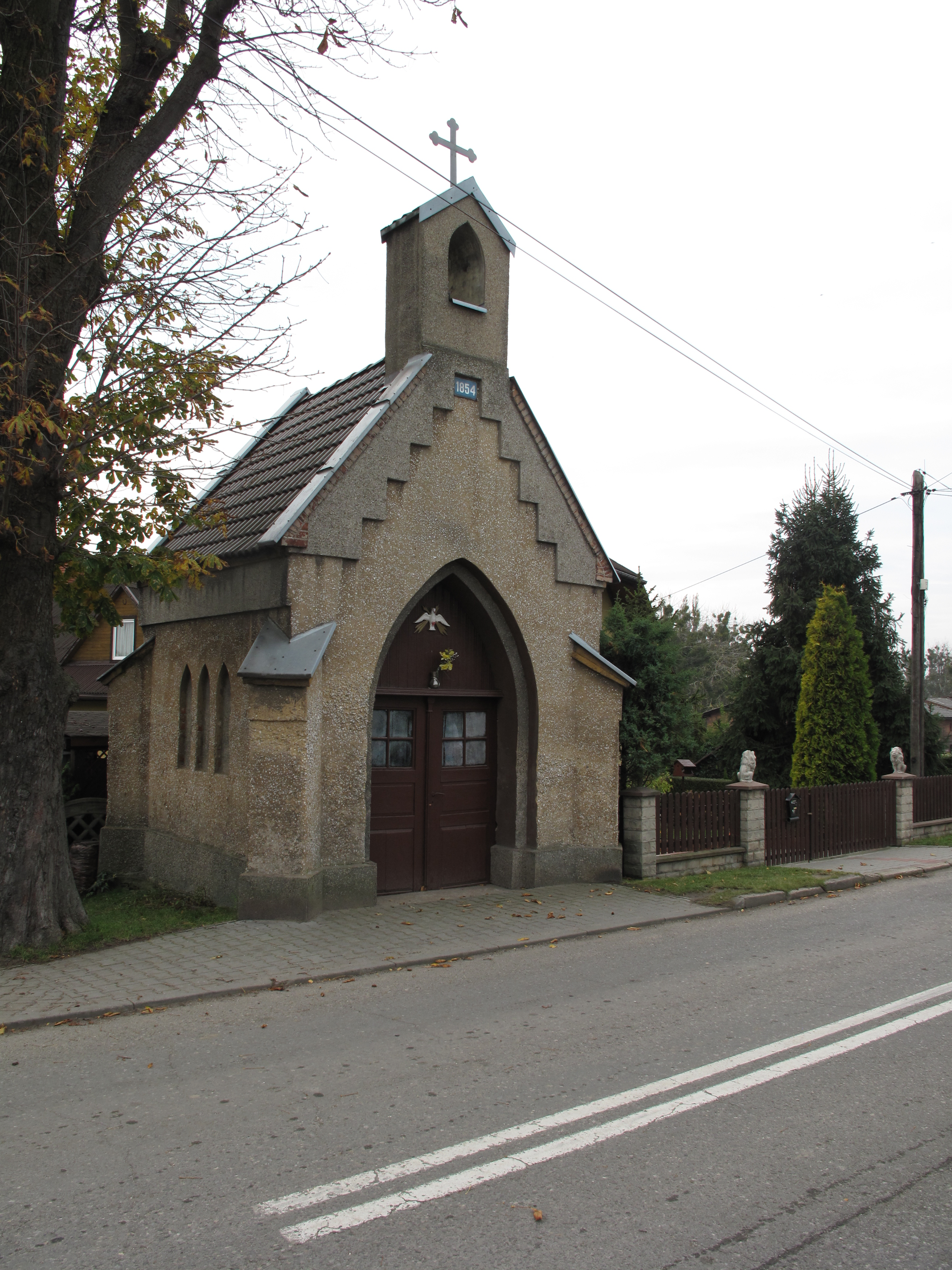
Village chapell

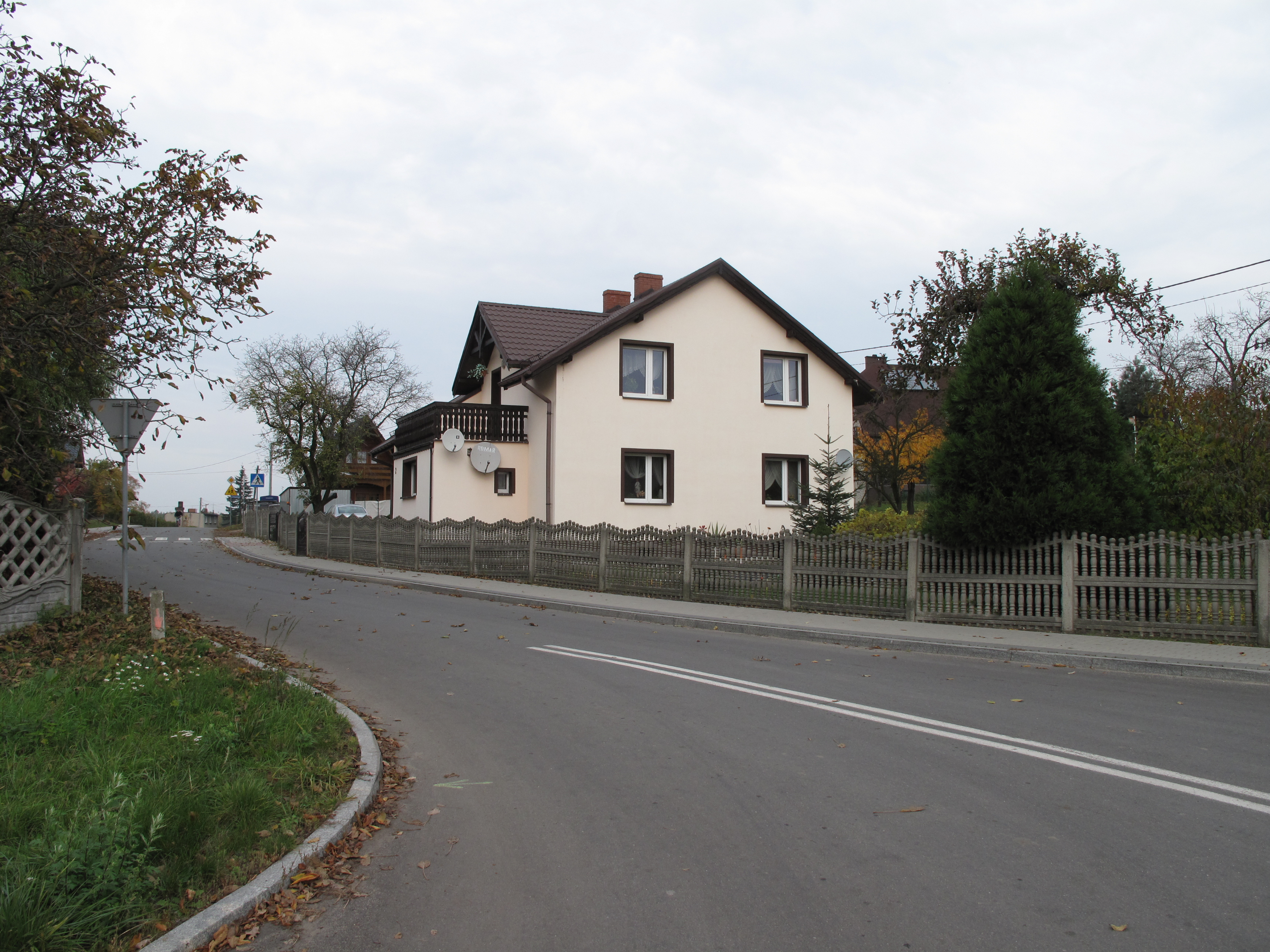
House
