= Krzesin, Lubusz Voivodeship =

Krzesin
- Village
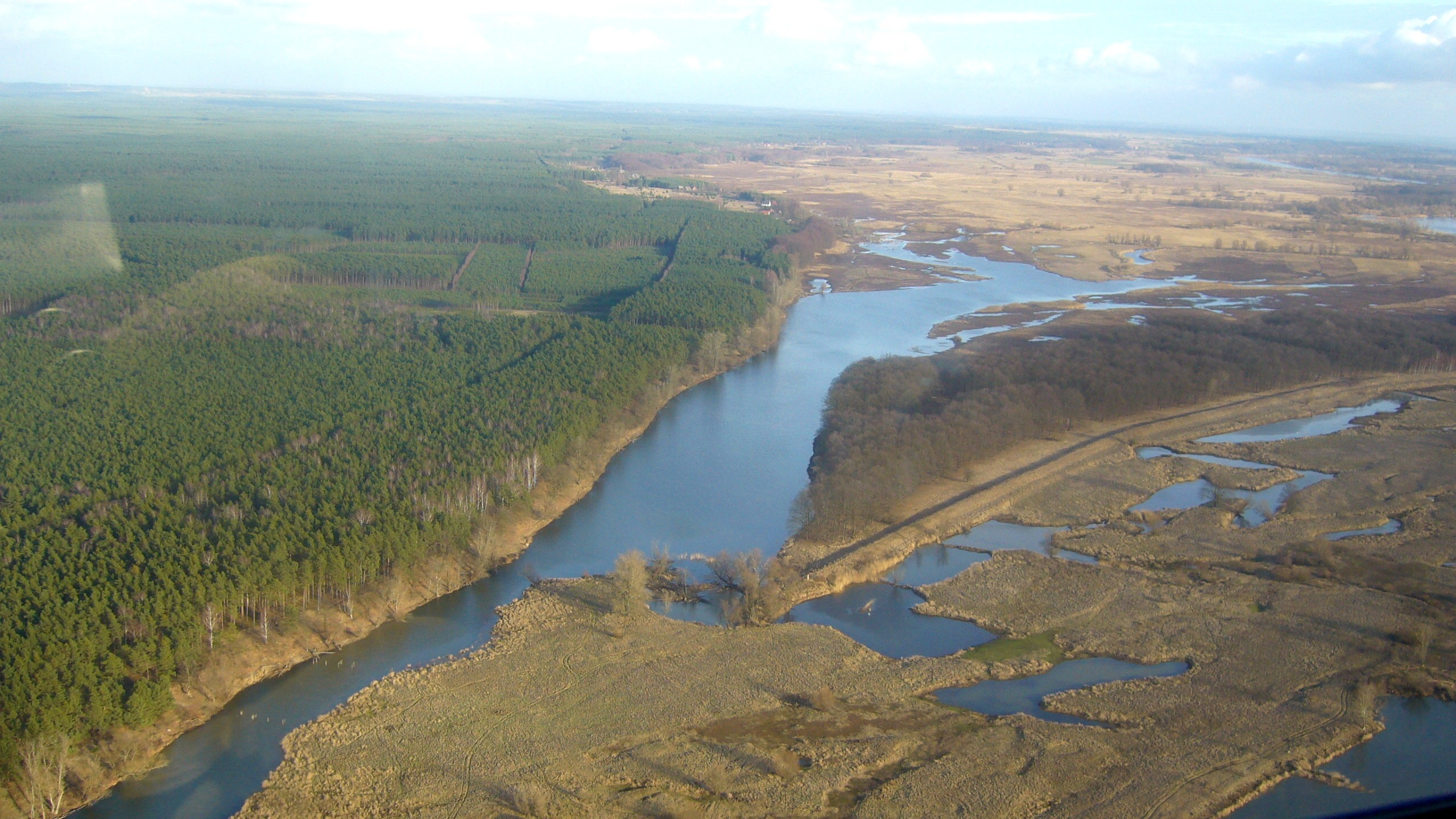
- Aerial view of Krzesin Landscape Park

- Location within Poland
- Coordinates: 52°05′39″N 14°46′21″E
- Country: Poland
- Voivodeship: Lubusz
- County: Słubice
- Gmina: Cybinka

Population
  - Total: 50
- Time zone: UTC+1 (CET)
  - Summer (DST): UTC+2 (CEST)
- Vehicle registration: FSL

Krzesin [ˈkʂɛɕin] is a village in the administrative district of Gmina Cybinka, within Słubice County, Lubusz Voivodeship, in western Poland, close to the German border. It is located within the historic Lubusz Land.

The village gives its name to the protected area called Krzesin Landscape Park.

== History ==
There are several archaeological sites in the village, including a Neolithic settlement and cemeteries from the Stone Age, Bronze Age and the Middle Ages. The area formed part of Poland since the establishment of the state in the 10th century. The territory was administratively located within the Lubusz castellany and the Catholic Diocese of Lubusz, both established in the early 12th century by Polish ruler Bolesław III Wrymouth. The village was founded in the Middle Ages. After Polish rule, the village was part of the Margraviate of Brandenburg and Bohemia (Czechia). Despite the annexation of the territory by Brandenburg, the area was still inhabited by Poles in the 17th century. From the 18th century, it was part of Prussia, and from 1871 to 1945 it was also part of Germany. After the defeat of Nazi Germany in World War II, in 1945, along with the right-bank Lubusz Land (portion situated east of the Oder River) the village became again part of Poland.
