= Krzesin Landscape Park =

Protected area in Lubusz Voivodeship, Poland

- Krzesiński Park Krajobrazowy
- IUCN category V (protected landscape/seascape)
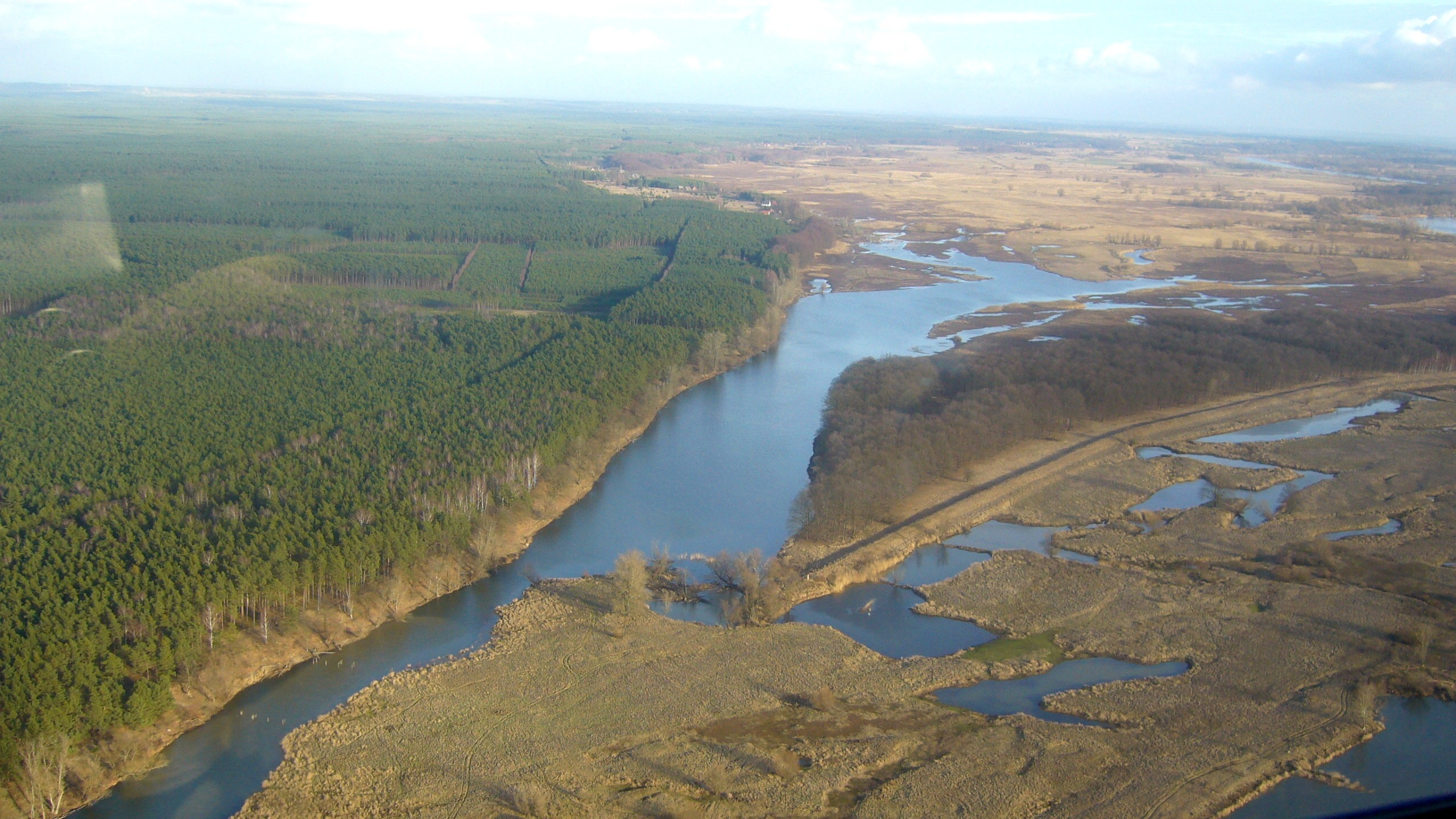
- Aerial view of the park

- Location within Lubusz Voivodeship Location within Poland
- Location: Lubusz Voivodeship
- Coordinates: 52°5′N 14°46′E
- Area: 85.46 km^{2} (33.00 sq mi)
- Established: 1998

Krzesin Landscape Park (Polish: Krzesiński Park Krajobrazowy) is a protected area (Landscape Park) located in western Poland which was established in 1998 and covers an area of 85.46 square kilometres (33.00 sq mi).

The park lies entirely within Lubusz Voivodeship: in Krosno County (Gmina Gubin, Gmina Maszewo) and Słubice County (Gmina Cybinka). It takes its name from the village of Krzesin in Gmina Cybinka.

== Natural features ==
It includes wet meadows and pastures in the valley of the Oder and Neisse, as well as parts of the Oder River's willow and poplar riparian forests. The park is also noted as a large white stork colony, the largest in western Poland. The park also features some rolling green meadows, mature shady trees and a diverse vegetation.

The conditions for agricultural production in the communes of the park are not very favorable, and the park has low tourist penetration.
