= Kutno County =

County in Łódź Voivodeship, Poland

Kutno County Powiat kutnowski
- County
- Flag Coat of arms

- Location within the voivodeship

- Division into gminas
- Coordinates (Kutno): 52°14′N 19°22′E
- Country: Poland
- Voivodeship: Łódź
- Seat: Kutno
- Gminas: Total 11 (incl. 1 urban): Kutno; Gmina Bedlno; Gmina Dąbrowice; Gmina Krośniewice; Gmina Krzyżanów; Gmina Kutno; Gmina Łanięta; Gmina Nowe Ostrowy; Gmina Oporów; Gmina Strzelce; Gmina Żychlin

Area
  - Total: 886.29 km^{2} (342.20 sq mi)

Population (2006)
  - Total: 104,124
  - Density: 117.48/km^{2} (304.28/sq mi)
  - Urban: 61,084
  - Rural: 43,040
- Time zone: UTC+1 (CET)
  - Summer (DST): UTC+2 (CEST)
- Car plates: EKU
- Website: www.kutno.pl

Kutno County (Polish: powiat kutnowski) is a unit of territorial administration and local government (powiat) in Łódź Voivodeship, central Poland. It came into being on 1 January 1999 as a result of the Polish local government reforms passed in 1998. Its administrative seat and largest town is Kutno, which lies 51 kilometres (32 mi) north of the regional capital Łódź. The county also contains the towns of Żychlin, lying 18 km (11 mi) east of Kutno, Krośniewice, 14 km (9 mi) west of Kutno, and Dąbrowice.

The county covers an area of 886.29 square kilometres (342.2 sq mi). As of 2006, its total population was 104,124, out of which the population of Kutno was 47,557, that of Żychlin is 8,880, that of Krośniewice was 4,647, and the rural population was 43,040.

== Neighbouring counties ==
Kutno County is bordered by Włocławek County and Gostynin County to the north, Łowicz County to the east, Łęczyca County to the south, and Koło County to the west.

== Administrative divisions ==
The county is subdivided into 11 gminas (one urban, three urban-rural and seven rural). These are listed in the following table, in descending order of population.

Gmina	Type	Area (km^{2})	Population (2006)	Seat
Kutno	urban	33.6	47,557	
Gmina Żychlin	urban-rural	76.7	12,984	Żychlin
Gmina Krośniewice	urban-rural	94.7	9,037	Krośniewice
Gmina Kutno	rural	122.3	8,357	Kutno *
Gmina Bedlno	rural	126.0	6,153	Bedlno
Gmina Krzyżanów	rural	103.0	4,468	Krzyżanów
Gmina Strzelce	rural	90.1	4,178	Strzelce
Gmina Nowe Ostrowy	rural	71.6	3,870	Nowe Ostrowy
Gmina Oporów	rural	67.7	2,753	Oporów
Gmina Łanięta	rural	54.8	2,673	Łanięta
Gmina Dąbrowice	urban-rural	45.9	2,094	Dąbrowice
* seat not part of the gmina
