= Paseka =

Paseka may refer to

- Paseka (name)
- Paseka (Olomouc District), a village and municipality in the Czech Republic
- Horní Paseka, a village and municipality in the Czech Republic

== See also ==
- Pasieka (disambiguation)
