= Aleksandrówka =

Aleksandrówka may refer to the following places:

- Aleksandrówka, Gmina Drelów, Biała County in Lublin Voivodeship (east Poland)
- Aleksandrówka, Chełm County in Lublin Voivodeship (east Poland)
- Aleksandrówka, Janów County in Lublin Voivodeship (east Poland)
- Aleksandrówka, Lubartów County in Lublin Voivodeship (east Poland)
- Aleksandrówka, Gmina Krynki in Podlaskie Voivodeship (north-east Poland)
- Aleksandrówka, Gmina Szudziałowo in Podlaskie Voivodeship (north-east Poland)
- Aleksandrówka, Suwałki County in Podlaskie Voivodeship (north-east Poland)
- Aleksandrówka, Gmina Dalików, Łódź Voivodeship (central Poland)
- Aleksandrówka, Gmina Żychlin, Łódź Voivodeship (central Poland)
- Aleksandrówka, Łuków County in Lublin Voivodeship (east Poland)
- Aleksandrówka, Grójec County in Masovian Voivodeship (east-central Poland)
- Aleksandrówka, Kozienice County in Masovian Voivodeship (east-central Poland)
- Aleksandrówka, Mińsk County in Masovian Voivodeship (east-central Poland)
- Aleksandrówka, Węgrów County in Masovian Voivodeship (east-central Poland)
- Aleksandrówka, Zwoleń County in Masovian Voivodeship (east-central Poland)
- Aleksandrówka, Greater Poland Voivodeship (central Poland)
- Aleksandrówka, Silesian Voivodeship (south Poland)
