= Żychlin =

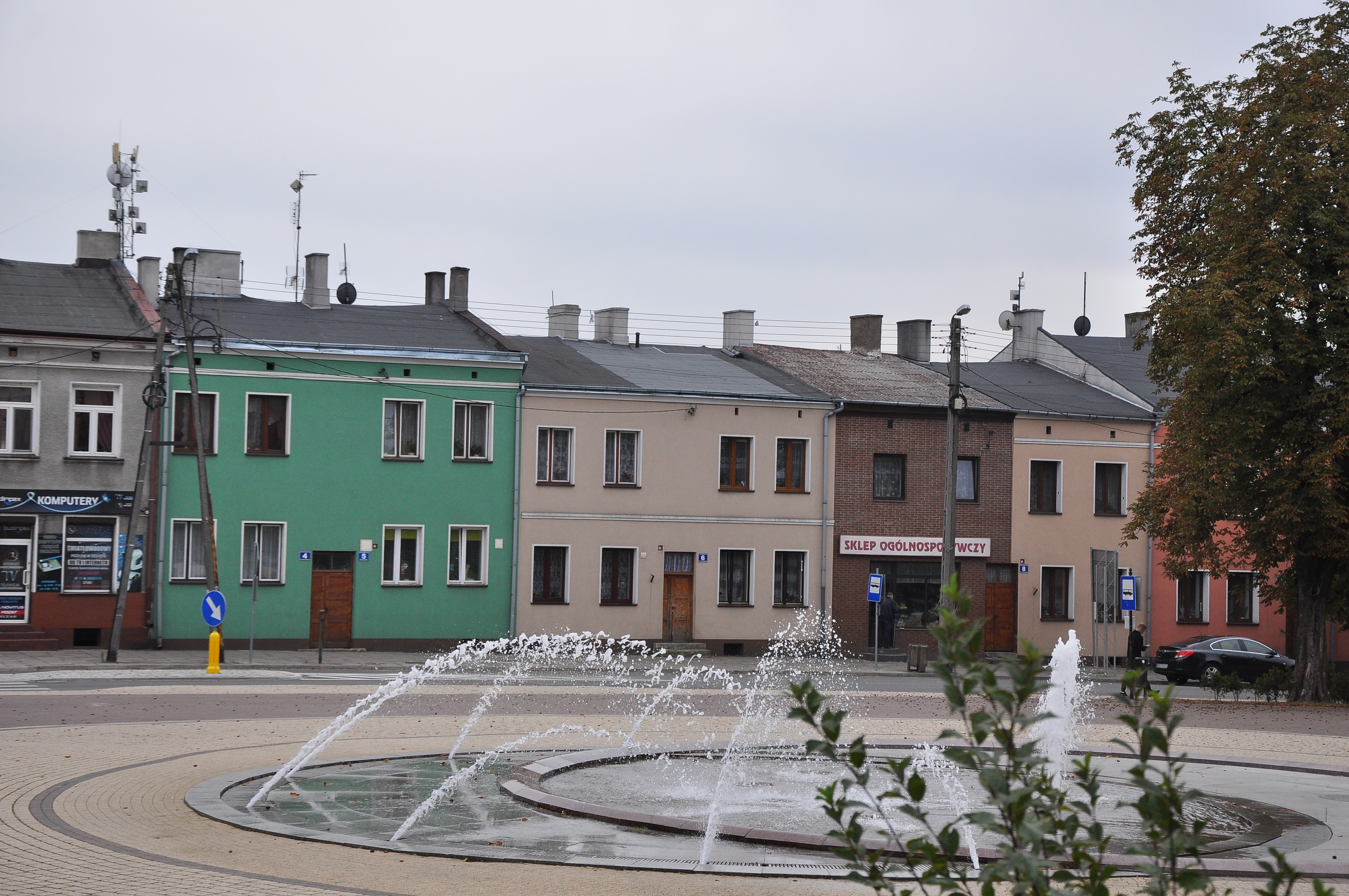
- 19th century tenement houses in the town center

- Flag Coat of arms

- Location within Poland
- Coordinates: 52°14′43″N 19°37′25″E
- Country: Poland
- Voivodeship: Łódź
- County: Kutno
- Gmina: Żychlin

Government
  - Mayor: Grzegorz Ambroziak

Area
  - Total: 8.69 km^{2} (3.36 sq mi)

Population (31 December 2020)
  - Total: 7,964 ▼
  - Density: 916/km^{2} (2,370/sq mi)
- Time zone: UTC+1 (CET)
  - Summer (DST): UTC+2 (CEST)
- Postal code: 99-320
- Vehicle registration: EKU6
- Website: http://www.gminazychlin.pl

Żychlin [ˈʐɨxlin], Hebrew ז'יכלין, Yiddish זשיכלין (other rarely used names include Zechlin and Zichlin) is a town in Kutno County, Łódź Voivodeship, in central Poland. It is the seat of Gmina Żychlin. It lies approximately 50 kilometres (31 miles) north of Łódź and 90 kilometres (56 miles) west of Warsaw. It has 7,964 inhabitants (2020).

== History ==
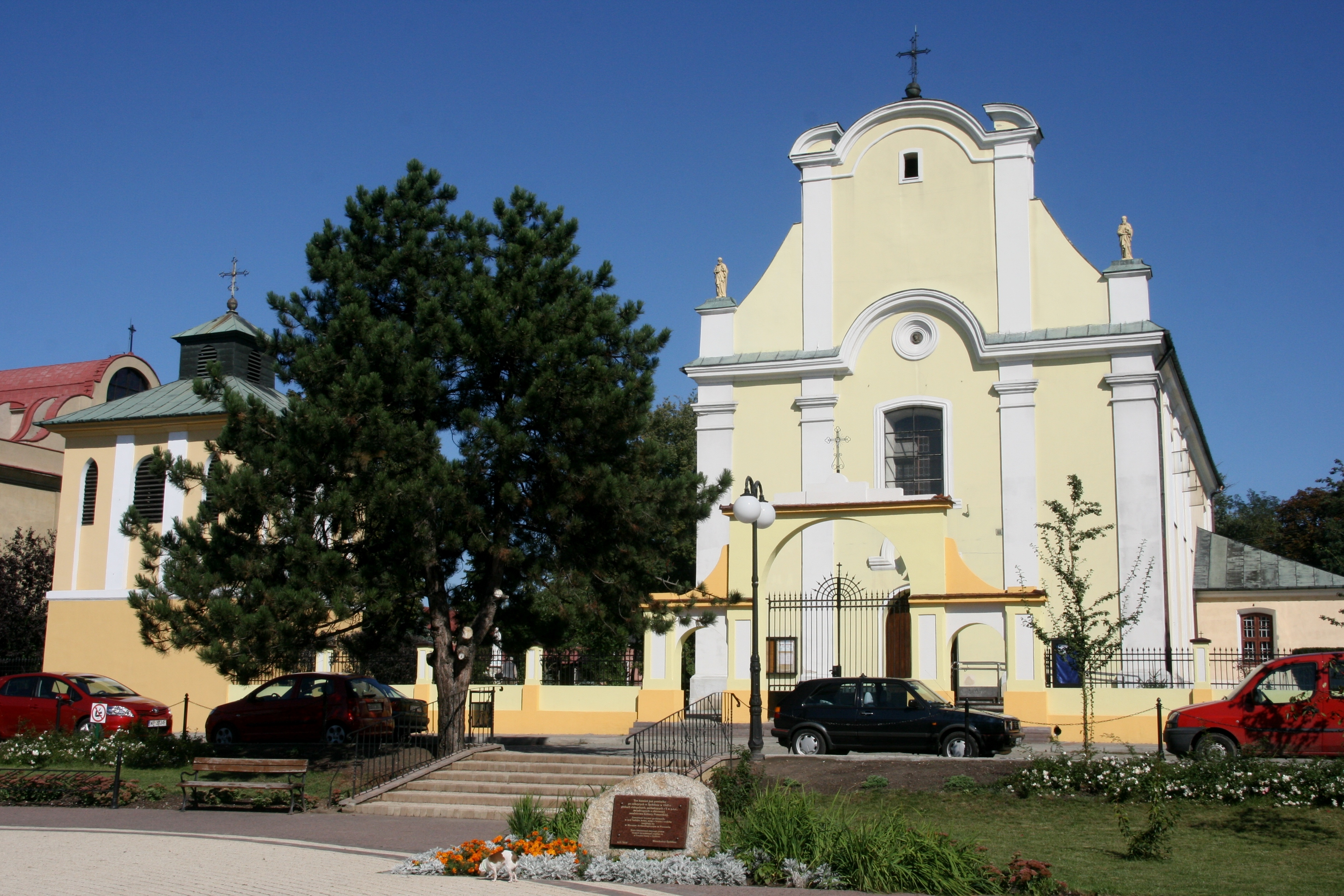
Baroque Saints Peter and Paul church

The village of Żychlin has existed at least since 1309. In 1331 it was captured by the Teutonic Knights, but shortly after was restored to Poland. It received city rights before 1397. Until the 19th century, the town was a private property. At the end of the Middle Ages, Żychlin was the place where away sessions of the Łęczyca town court took place. Żychlin was a private town, administratively located in the Orłów County in the Łęczyca Voivodeship in the Greater Poland Province of the Kingdom of Poland.

In the second half of the sixteenth century, the city suffered from a major fire disaster. The reconstruction was slow and even the privilege of fairs awarded to the king did not significantly affect the city's significant development. In 1790 Żychlin had 350 inhabitants and 68 houses.

Historical population
Year	Pop.	±%
1921	7,098	—
1931	8,285	+16.7%
2010	8,430	+1.8%

In the late-18th-century Partitions of Poland, the town was annexed by Prussia. In 1807 it was regained by Poles and included with the short-lived Duchy of Warsaw, and in 1815 it fell to the Russian Partition of Poland. In the 19th century the population of the town increased significantly. The town was briefly liberated by local Polish insurgents during the January Uprising in 1863. In 1870, due to the Tsarist decree, Żychlin lost its city rights due to the towns support for the January Uprising. At the end of the 19th century, the city had over 4,500 inhabitants, with a sizeable Jewish minority, following the influx of Jews after the implementation of Russian discriminatory policies (see Pale of Settlement). Żychlin was again part of Poland, after the country regained independence after World War I in 1918.

According to the 1921 census, the town had a population of 7,098, 70.3% Polish and 29.7% Jewish. 1921 saw the creation of electric plants by Zygmunt Okoniewski. Over time, due to the new electromechanical plant, the city grew and gained importance among the surrounding towns. In 1924 Żychlin regained its municipal rights.

=== World War II ===
During World War II, the town suffered great losses, mainly among the civilian population - almost 40% of the town's population. During the war invasion of Poland, there were field hospitals in the town and in the Dobrzelin village, often bombarded by German air force. Numerous Polish soldiers are buried in the military quarters at the local parish cemetery and the parish cemetery in the village of Śleszyn and the military cemetery in Dobrzelin.

In 1939 it was annexed by Nazi Germany to Wartheland. German beatings and harassment of Jews began when the Germans arrived in September 1939. The Germans confiscated Jewish business and property and Polish farms and houses and turned them over to ethnic Germans who had been resettled in the town in accordance with the Lebensraum policy. Jews were brought to Żychlin from surrounding areas. In April 1940, the Germans arrested both Polish Christian and Jewish members of the intelligentsia, especially teachers, and sent them to concentration camps. In June and July 1940, Germans expelled 430 Poles from the town center, and their homes were handed over to German colonists, and in August 1940 further 90 Poles, owners of shops and workshops with entire families, were expelled. Expelled Poles were initially held in a transit camp in Łódź for three weeks, and then people aged 15–24 were deported to forced labour in Germany, and the rest were deported to the General Government. Later in 1940, Jews were moved to an overcrowded ghetto where many of the inhabitants had no means of support. In late 1941, hundreds of Jewish workers were sent to labor camps in the Poznań area. In 1942, murders of Jews began in large scale through public executions in the ghetto and at the Jewish cemetery. In March 1942, the remaining 3,200 Jews were rounded up, beaten and robbed, and taken to the Chełmno extermination camp where they were immediately murdered. Perhaps 25-50 of Żychlin's Jews survived, most were those who had been sent away to labor camps, those who had fled to the Soviet Union, and some who hid.

A Yizkor book for Zychlin was published in 1974 in both Hebrew and Yiddish. The book is available for purchase and for free online. It was published in English in October 2022 by JewishGen press, the United States Holocaust Memorial Museum library call number DS134.66.Z93 S44 2022, ISBN number 97819541765151954176511.

== Hasidism in Zychlin ==
The founder of the Żychlin Hasidic dynasty Rabbi Shmuel Abba was born to Reb Zelig on the 19th of Kislev in the city of Luvitch. The first Rebbe of Zychlin, was Rabbi Shmuel Abba who had a small following of Hasidim and lived at his father-in-law's house. When he moved to Zychlin for monetary reasons he acquired a larger following. He was known as a miracle worker. He spent time in jail because his detractors were upset that he practiced practical Kabbalah.

Ninety-five percent of Zychliner Hassidim perished during the Holocaust, the last Rebbes dying at the hands of the Nazis.

== Transport ==
Żychlin lies at the intersection of voivodeship roads 583 and 573.

Żychlin has a station on the Berlin-Warsaw railway line. However, only regional trains between Kutno and Łowicz stop here. The Berlin-Warszawa Express train passes through the station without stopping.
