= Kruki =

Kruki may refer to the following places:

- Kruki, Łódź Voivodeship (central Poland)
- Kruki, Mińsk County in Masovian Voivodeship (east-central Poland)
- Kruki, Ostrołęka County in Masovian Voivodeship (east-central Poland)
- Kruki, Warmian-Masurian Voivodeship (north Poland)
