= Grabie =

Grabie may refer to the following places:

- Grabie, Kuyavian-Pomeranian Voivodeship (north-central Poland)
- Grabie, Wieliczka County in Lesser Poland Voivodeship (south Poland)
- Grabie, Łódź Voivodeship (central Poland)
- Grabie, Bochnia County in Lesser Poland Voivodeship (south Poland)
- Grabie, Kraków County in Lesser Poland Voivodeship (south Poland)
- Grabie, Masovian Voivodeship (east-central Poland)
- Grabie, Greater Poland Voivodeship (west-central Poland)
- Grabie, Opole Voivodeship (south-west Poland)
