= Marianska =

Marianska, Mariańska, Mariánska or Mariánská may refer to:

- Mariánská Týnice, a pilgrimage destination in the Czech Republic
- Gmina Puszcza Mariańska, a rural district in east-central Poland
- Puszcza Mariańska, a village in east-central Poland
- Mariánska hora, a hill in Levoča, Slovakia

== See also ==
- Marianka (disambiguation)
