= Sedki =

Sedki may refer to:

== People ==
Sedki is a spelling of the name Sidqi.

== Places ==
- Sędki, Łódź Voivodeship, Polish village
- Sędki, Warmian-Masurian Voivodeship, Polish village
