= Stolpersteine in Tišnov =

Memorial installations in Czech Republic

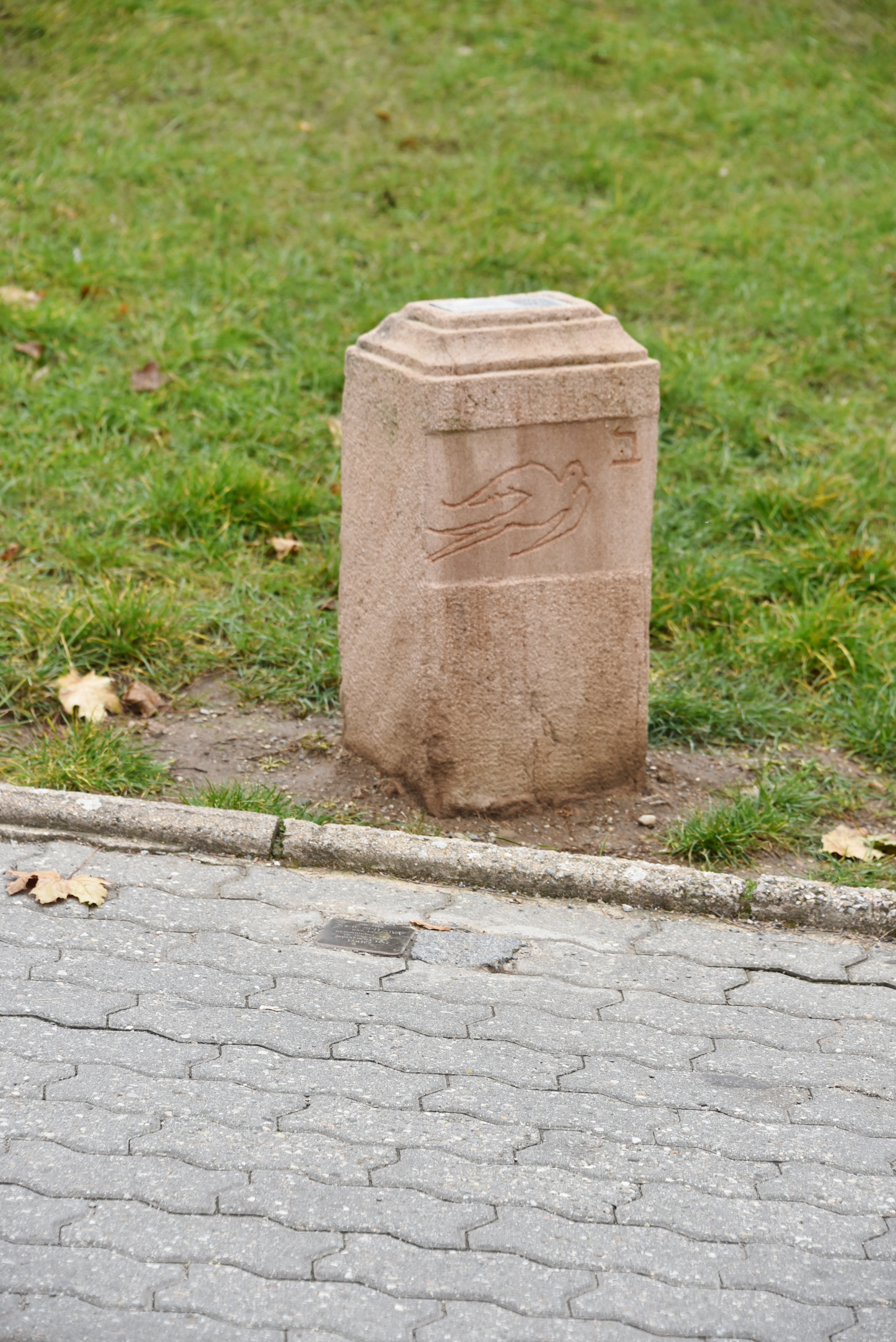
Stolperstein for Zofie Spitzová, murdered at the age of 75

This article lists the Stolpersteine in the town Tišnov (Czech pronunciation: [ˈcɪʃnof]; German: Tischnowitz, Brno-Country District) in the South Moravian Region (Czech: Jihomoravský kraj). Stolpersteine is the German name for stumbling blocks collocated all over Europe by German artist Gunter Demnig. They remember the fate of the Nazi victims being murdered, deported, exiled or driven to suicide.

Generally, the stumbling blocks are posed in front of the building where the victims had their last self-chosen residence. The name of the Stolpersteine in Czech is: Kameny zmizelých, stones of the disappeared.

The lists are sortable; the basic order follows the alphabet according to the last name of the victim.

== Tišnov ==
Stone	Inscription	Location	Life and death
	HERE LIVED; ALFRÉD KELLNER; BORN 1883; DEPORTED 1942; TO THERESIENSTADT; MURDERED 1942; IN REJOWIEC	Jungmannova 86; 49.349414°N 16.420371°E	Alfréd Kellner was born on 29 July 1883 in Tišnov. He had at least one brother, Jakob (born 1873), and one sister, Terezie (born 1880). He became a metallurgical manager and married Helena née Hauselová. According to Yad Vashem, he was deported to Nisko either on 17 or 26 October 1939. It is not known who long he stayed there and when he came back. The last residence of the couple before deportation was in Tišnov. On 4 April 1942, Alfred and Jakob Kellner, their wives Hedvika and Helena as well as their sister Terezie were deported from Brno to Theresienstadt concentration camp by transport Ah. His transport number was 278 of 1,001. There the family was torn apart and step by step murdered by the Nazi regime. Two weeks after arrival, on 18 April 1942, Alfred Kellner and his wife were deported to Rejowiec by transport Ap. His transport number was 459 of 1,001. Both were murdered by the Nazi regime. Also his sister, his brother and his sister-in-law became victims of the Shoah.
	HERE LIVED; JAKOB KELLNER; BORN 1873; DEPORTED 1942; TO THERESIENSTADT; MURDERED 1944; IN AUSCHWITZ	Jungmannova 86; 49.349414°N 16.420371°E	Jakob Kellner, also Yaakov, was born on 14 March 1873 in Romania. He was a successful businessman, had a shop in Jungmannova 86, and ran a wholesale with several employees and trucks delivering goods to neighbor communities. He was married to Hedvika née Zeislová. The couple had a son, Heřman, who died of Leukemia while still a school boy. The last residence of the couple before deportation was in Tišnov. On 4 April 1942, Alfred and Jakob Kellner, their wives Hedvika and Helena as well as their sister Terezie were deported from Brno to Theresienstadt concentration camp by transport Ah. His transport number was 280 of 1,001. There the family was torn apart and step by step murdered by the Nazi regime. Two weeks after arrival, Alfred Kellner and his wife were deported to Rejowiec. Half a year after their arrival, on 9 October 1942, his wife died in Theresienstadt. Within the same month, Terezie Kellnerová was deported to Auschwitz concentration camp. One and a half years later, on 15 May 1944, he too was deported to Auschwitz by transport Dz. His transport number was 318 of 2,501. He lost his life there.
	HERE LIVED; HEDVIKA; KELLNEROVÁ; NÉE ZEISLOVÁ; BORN 1888; DEPORTED 1942; TO THERESIENSTADT; MURDERED 1942; IBIDEM	Jungmannova 86; 49.349414°N 16.420371°E	Hedvika Kellnerová née Zeislová was born on 13 January 1888 in Lomnice. Her parents were David Zeisel and Aloisia Louise née Fleischer. She had three sisters, one half brother and three half sisters. She was married to Jakob Kellner. The couple had a son, Heřman, who died of Leukemia while still a school boy. The last residence of the couple before deportation was in Tišnov. On 4 April 1942, Hedvika Kellnerová and her husband were deported from Brno to Theresienstadt concentration camp by transport Ah. Her transport number was 281 if 1,001. Half a year later, on 9 October 1942, she lost her life in Theresienstadt. Her husband was deported to Auschwitz concentration camp in 1944 and murdered there.
	HERE LIVED; HELENA; KELLNEROVÁ; NÉE HAUSELOVÁ; BORN 1888; DEPORTED 1942; TO THERESIENSTADT; MURDERED 1942; IN REJOWIEC	Jungmannova 86; 49.349414°N 16.420371°E	Helena Kellnerová née Hauselová was born on 1. 10. 1888. She was married to Alfred Kellner. The last residence of the couple before deportation was in Tišnov. On 4 April 1942, Helena Kellnerová, her husband and his siblings were deported from Brno to Theresienstadt concentration camp by transport Ah. Her transport number was 279 of 1,001. There the family was torn apart and step by step murdered by the Nazi regime. Two weeks after arrival, on 18 April 1942, Helena Kellnerová and her husband were deported to Rejowiec by transport Ap. Her transport number was 460 of 1,001. Both were murdered by the Nazi regime.
	HERE LIVED; TEREZIE; KELLNEROVÁ; BORN 1890; DEPORTED 1942; TO THERESIENSTADT; MURDERED 1944; IN AUSCHWITZ	Jungmannova 86; 49.349414°N 16.420371°E	Terezie Kellnerová was born on 8 September 1880 or 1890. She had at least two brothers, Jakob (born 1873) and Alfred (born 1883). She was blind and lived with her older brother and his wife. Her last residence before deportation was in Tišnov. On 4 April 1942, Terezie Kellnerová, her brothers and their wives were deported from Brno to Theresienstadt concentration camp by transport Ah. Her transport number was 282 of 1,001. There the family was torn apart and step by step murdered by the Nazi regime. First, her brother Alfred and his wife were deported to Rejowiec. Half a year after their arrival, on 9 October 1942, the wife of her brother Jakob died in Theresienstadt. Within the same month, on 26 October 1942, Terezie Kellnerová was deported to Auschwitz concentration camp by transport By. Her transport number was 428. There she was murdered by the Nazi regime. At last, in May 1944 her brother Jakob was also deported to Auschwitz, where he lost his life.
	HERE LIVED; LEOPOLD; ÖSTEREICHER; BORN 1894; DEPORTED 1942; TO THERESIENSTADT; MURDERED 1944; IN AUSCHWITZ	Klášterská 355; 49.350413°N 16.416467°E	Leopold Österreicher was born on 3 April 1894. He was arrested and deported on 4 April 1942 from Brno to Theresienstadt concentration camp by transport Ah. His transport number was 273 of 1,001. Six months later, on 6 October 1942, he was deported to Auschwitz concentration camp by transport Eo. His transport number was 1138 of 1,550. He was murdered there by the Nazi regime.
	HERE LIVED; ALFRED POLLAK; BORN 1887; DEPORTED 1942; TO THERESIENSTADT; MURDERED 1942; IN LUBLIN	Dvořáčkova 66; 49.349592°N 16.421431°E	Alfred Pollak was born on 1 November 1887. He was married to Helena née Mandlová, the couple had two daughters: Růžena Naděžda (born 1935) and Anna Libuše (born 1938). The last residence of the family before deportation was in Tišnov. On 4 April 1942, the family and Ema Libuše Pollaková were arrested and deported from Brno to Theresienstadt concentration camp by transport Ah. His transport number was 270 of 1,001. There, after two weeks, Ema Libuše Pollaková was separated from the rest of the family and deported to Rejowiec, Lublin Voivodeship. Five weeks later, also Alfred Pollak, his wife and their little daughters were deported East. According to Yad Vashem, on 25 May 1942, they were sent to an "unknown place", according to holocaust.cz to Lublin. His transport number was 881 of 997. The whole family was extinct in the course of the Shoah. Also Ema Libuše Pollaková was murdered.
	HERE LIVED; ANNA LIBUŠE; POLLAKOVÁ; BORN 1938; DEPORTED 1942; TO THERESIENSTADT; MURDERED 1942; IN LUBLIN	Dvořáčkova 66; 49.349592°N 16.421431°E	Anna Libuše Pollaková was born 15 November 1938. Her parents were Alfred Pollak and Helena née Mandlová. She and her sister Růžena Naděžda (born 1935) grew up in Tišnov. On 4 April 1942, all family members including the two little girls were arrested and deported from Brno to Theresienstadt concentration camp by transport Ah. Her transport number was 268 of 1,001. Seven weeks later, on 25 May 1942, the parents and their daughters were deported by transport Az, according to Yad Vashem to an "unknown place", according to holocaust.cz to Lublin. Her transport number was 879 of 997. At age three, the girl was murdered in the course of the Shoah, also her sister and her parents.
	HERE LIVED; EMA POLLAKOVÁ; BORN 1900; DEPORTED 1942; TO THERESIENSTADT; MURDERED 1942; IN REJOWIEC	Dvořáčkova 66; 49.349592°N 16.421431°E	Ema Libuše Pollaková was born on 11 May 1900. Her last residence before deportation was in Tišnov. On 4 April 1942, Ema Libuše Pollaková was arrested and deported from Brno to Theresienstadt concentration camp by transport Ah, together with Alfred Pollak, his wife Helena und their two little daughters. Her transport number was 271 of 1,001. There, after two weeks, on 18 April 1942, Ema Libuše Pollaková was separated from Alfred Pollak and his family. She was deported to Rejowiec, Lublin Voivodeship by transport Ap. Her transport number was 454 of 1,000. There she perished. Also Alfred Pollak, his wife and their daughters were murdered.
	HERE LIVED; HELENA POLLAKOVÁ; NÉE MANDLOVÁ; BORN 1897; DEPORTED 1942; TO THERESIENSTADT; MURDERED 1942; IN LUBLIN	Dvořáčkova 66; 49.349592°N 16.421431°E	Helena Pollaková née Mandlová was born 4 September 1897. She was married to Alfred Pollak. The couple had two daughters: Růžena Naděžda (born 1935) and Anna Libuše (born 1938). The last residence of the family before deportation was in Tišnov. On 4 April 1942, the family and Ema Libuše Pollaková were arrested and deported from Brno to Theresienstadt concentration camp by transport Ah. Her transport number was 269 of 1,001. There, after two weeks, Ema Libuše Pollaková was separated from the rest of the family and deported to Rejowiec, Lublin Voivodeship. She was murdered by the Nazi regime. Five weeks later, also Helena Pollaková, her husband and their little daughters were deported East. According to Yad Vashem, on 25 May 1942, they were sent to an "unknown place", according to holocaust.cz to Lublin. Her transport number was 880 of 997. The whole family was murdered.
	HERE LIVED; RŮŽENA NADĚŽDA; POLLAKOVÁ; BORN 1935; DEPORTED 1942; TO THERESIENSTADT; MURDERED 1942; IN LUBLIN	Dvořáčkova 66; 49.349592°N 16.421431°E	Růžena Naděžda Pollaková was born on 10 July 1935. Her parents were Alfred Pollak and Helena née Mandlová. She and her sister Anna Libuše (born 1938) grew up in Tišnov. On 4 April 1942, all family members including the two little girls were arrested and deported from Brno to Theresienstadt concentration camp by transport Ah. Her transport number was 267 of 1,001. Seven weeks later, on 25 May 1942, the parents and their daughters were deported by transport Az, according to Yad Vashem to an "unknown place", according to holocaust.cz to Lublin. Her transport number was 878 of 997. At age six, the girl was murdered in the course of the Shoah, also her sister and her parents.
	HERE LIVED; ŽOFIE SPITZOVÁ; BORN 1867; DEPORTED 1942; TO THERESIENSTADT; MURDERED 1942; IBIDEM	Brněnská 1710; 49.348576°N 16.422189°E	Žofie Spitzová was born on 9 November 1867. She was arrested and, on 4 April 1942, deported from Brno to Theresienstadt concentration camp by transport Ah. Her transport number was 266. One week later, on 11 April 1942, Žofie Spitzová lost her life in Theresienstadt. The death certificate mentions Marasmus senilis as the cause of death.
	HERE LIVED; ARNOLD STRÁNSKÝ; BORN 1882; DEPORED 1942; TO THERESIENSTADT; MURDERED 1942; IN IZBICA	Brněnská 9; 49.347612°N 16.423236°E	Arnold Stránský was born 1 October 1882. He was married and had two sons: Heřman (born on 18 April 1910) and Jiří (born on 31 March 1921). After the destruction of Czechoslovakia and the take-over of power by the Nazi regime, the three men lived in Brněnská 9, all single. Arnold Stránský was a widower at that time. ″They were very polite and dedicated people″, said a surviving witness. The family was highly respected in Tišnov and regularly donated from their stock for charity events. They owned the house they were living in and ran a shop with fabrics and leathers. Heřman Stránský worked as a lawyer. Jiří Stránský completed high school but could not study as the Nazis had closed down all universities in Bohemia and Moravia. While his younger son stayed at an Umschulungslager in Lipa, a so-called reeducation camp, since October 1941, Arnold Stránský and his elder son were arrested and deported on 4 April 1942 from Brno to Theresienstadt concentration camp by transport Ah. His transport number was 265 of 1,001. In the same month, on 27 April 1942, father and son were deported to Izbica Ghetto by transport Aq. His transport number was 569 of 999. Both were murdered in the course of the Shoah. Also his younger son Jiří Stránský was murdered by the Nazi regime.
	HERE LIVED; HEŘMAN STRÁNSKÝ; BORN 1910; DEPORTED 1942; TO THERESIENSTADT; MURDERED 1942; IN MAJDANEK	Brněnská 9; 49.347612°N 16.423236°E	Heřman Stránský was born on 18 April 1910. His father was Arnold Stránský, a merchant. He had a younger brother named Jiří (born 1921). He studied law, came back to his hometown and became a lawyer. He was single. His mother had died, he lived with his father and his brother in the house Brněnská 9, owned by the family. He was one of the first tennis players of Tišnov. In October 1942, his brother was brought to an Umschulungslager in Lipa, a so-called reeducation camp. On 4 April 1942, JUDr. Heřman Stránský and his father were arrested and deported from Brno to Theresienstadt concentration camp by transport Ah. His transport number was 264 of 1,001. The same month, on 27 April 1942, father and son were deported to Izbica Ghetto by transport Aq. His transport number was 568 of 999. According to a website, his father was probably murdered right after arrival while his son was brought to Majdanek concentration camp. Supposedly he was registered there on 23 July 1942 as prisoner no. 6547. He lost his life in the course of the Shoah. Also his brother Jiří Stránský was murdered by the Nazi regime.
	HERE LIVED; JIŘÍ STRÁNSKÝ; BORN 1921; DEPORTED 1942; TO THERESIENSTADT; MURDERED 1944; IN SCHWARZHEIDE	Brněnská 9; 49.347612°N 16.423236°E	Jiří Stránský was born 31 March 1921. His father was Arnold Stránský, a merchant. He had an older brother named Heřman (born 1910) who became a lawyer. He learned easily, brought home a lot of A-grades and could achieve a High School diploma. He had no chance to study as the Nazi regime had closed down all universities in Bohemia and Moravia. From 8 October 1941 till 1 March 1943 he was interred in a Umerziehungslager, a reeducation camp, in Lípa, Havlíčkův Brod District. There, about 300 Jewish men, aged 18 to 25, performed forced labor in agriculture, in constructing railroads or in snow removal. It was a form of concentration camp but had no fences. Due to their work in the fields, the inmates had enough food and in the evenings and in the wintertime they engaged in a series of cultural events, even presenting theatrical performances. In a cast list of Shakespeare's Midsummer Night's Dream the name J. Stransky is mentioned, but it has not yet been clarified if he or an inmate named Jan Stransky from Prague was the actor in this performance. During his stay in Lípa, in April 1942, both his father and his brother were first deported to Theresienstadt concentration camp and then to Izbica Ghetto, where both were murdered. Also, Jiří Stránský was deported to Theresienstadt and was kept there for more than a year. On 15 May 1944 he was deported to Auschwitz concentration camp, but was then transferred to Schwarzheide in the very south of Brandenburg. There the Germans needed strong men to produce gasoline and diesel fuel from lignite coal. About 1,000 Czech Jews were forced to work there and about 800 of them lost their lives. Among them was Jiří Stránský who died on 29 October 1944.

== Date of collocations ==
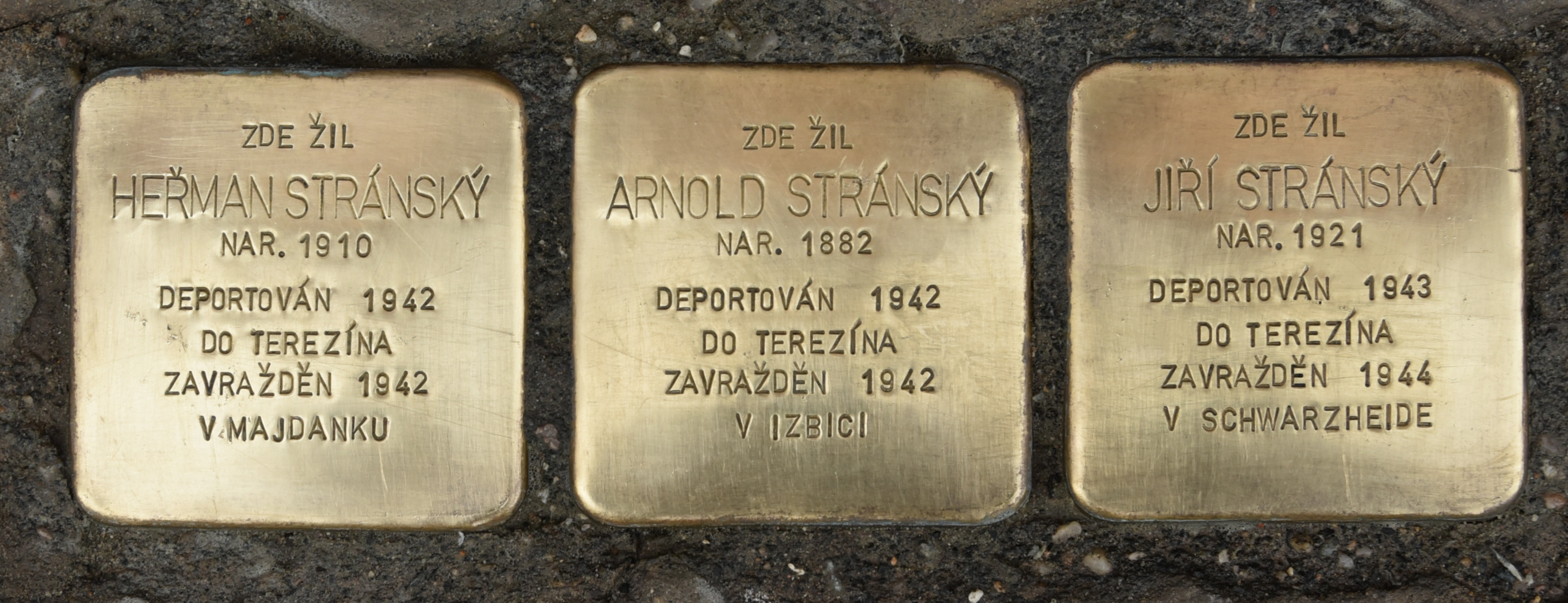
Stolpersteine for family Stránský in Brněnská 9

The Stolpersteine in Tišnov were collocated by the artist himself on 15 September 2014.

The Czech Stolperstein project was initiated in 2008 by the Česká unie židovské mládeže (Czech Union of Jewish Youth) and was realized with the patronage of the Mayor of Prague.

== See also ==
- List of cities by country that have stolpersteine
- Stolpersteine in the Czech Republic
