= Rejowiec, Lublin Voivodeship =

Rejowiec
- Town
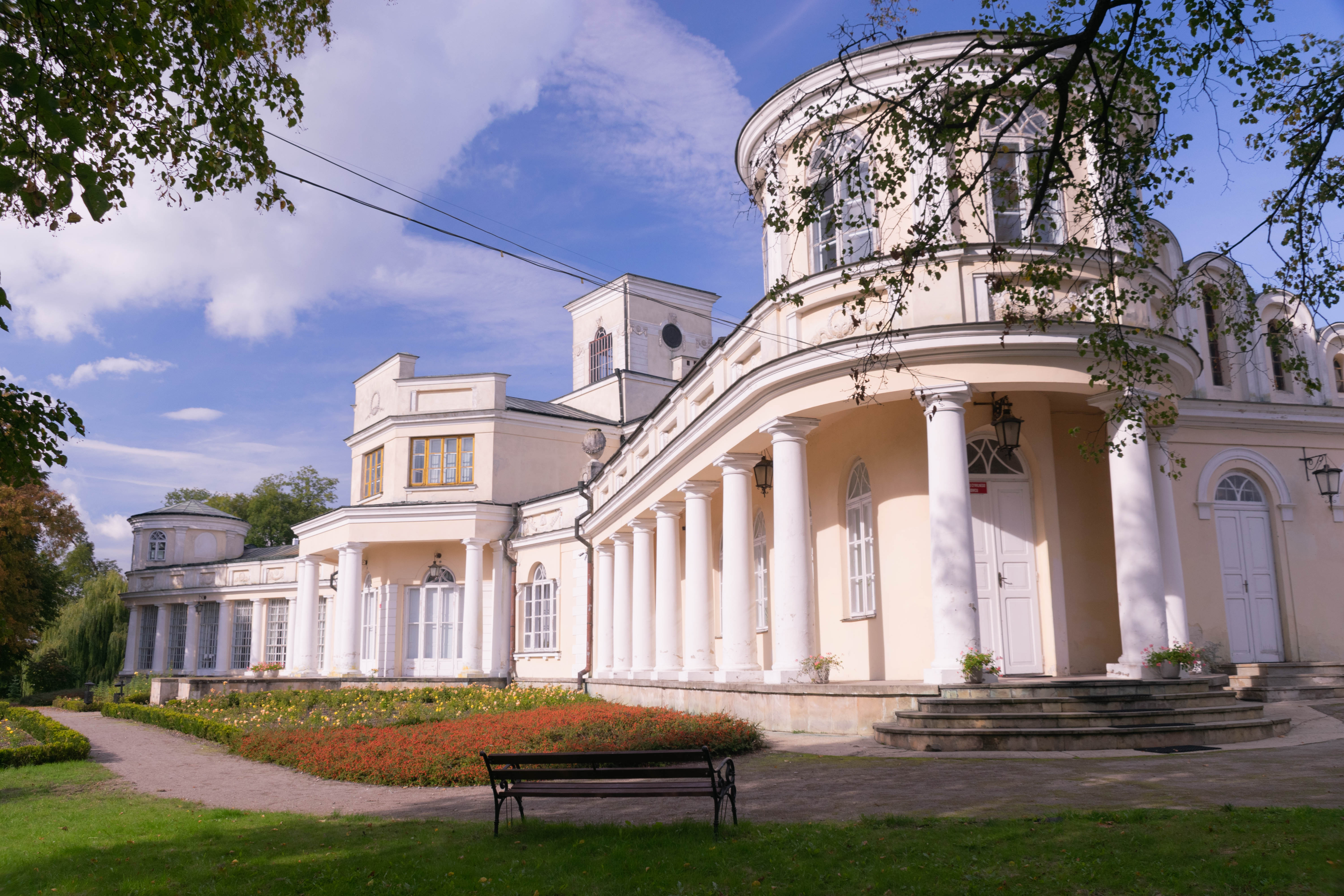
- Ossoliński Palace (now location of town hall and town council)

- Coat of arms

- Location within Poland
- Coordinates: 51°5′N 23°16′E
- Country: Poland
- Voivodeship: Lublin
- County: Chełm
- Gmina: Rejowiec
- Town rights: 1547
- Named after: Mikołaj Rej

Population
  - Total: 2,114
- Time zone: UTC+1 (CET)
  - Summer (DST): UTC+2 (CEST)
- Vehicle registration: LCH

Rejowiec (Polish: [rɛˈjɔvjɛt͡s]; Yiddish: רייוועץ or רייוויץ) is a town in Chełm County, Lublin Voivodeship, in eastern Poland. It is the seat of the gmina (administrative district) called Gmina Rejowiec.

== History ==
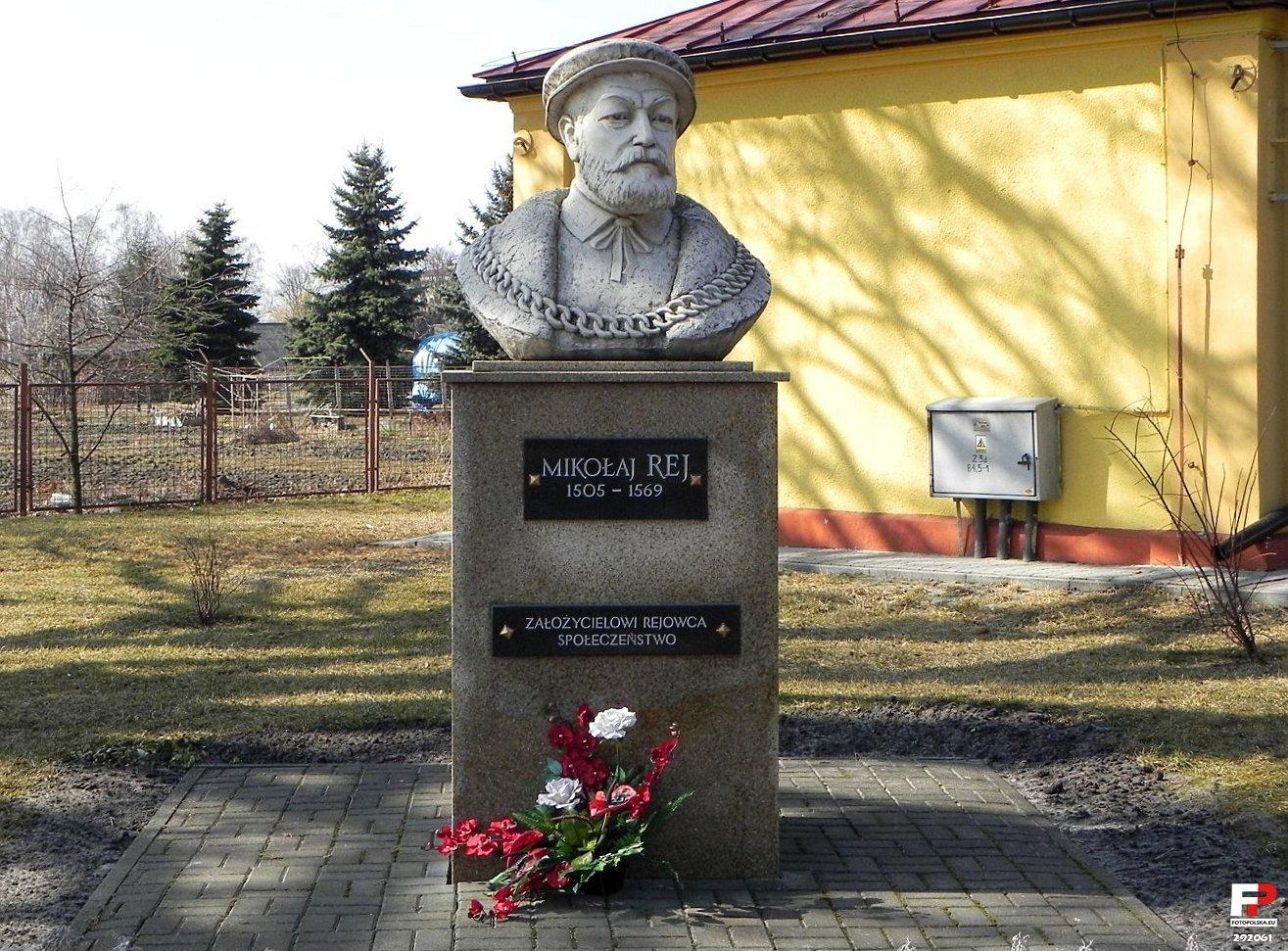
Mikołaj Rej Monument

The village was established in the 16th century by a family of noblemen named Rej, who were active in spreading the Calvinist religion, and established a religious college in the village.

In 1547, Rejowiec received acknowledgement (and privileges) as a town, from King Sigismund I the Old, including the right to hold two annual fairs, and an exemption from taxes for 10 years. In the 17th century the owners of Rejowiec changed a number of times, and the Calvinist College was closed. In the 18th century, when the number Catholics started to grow, the remaining Calvinist population dwindled and by the end of this century there were no more Calvinists in the town.

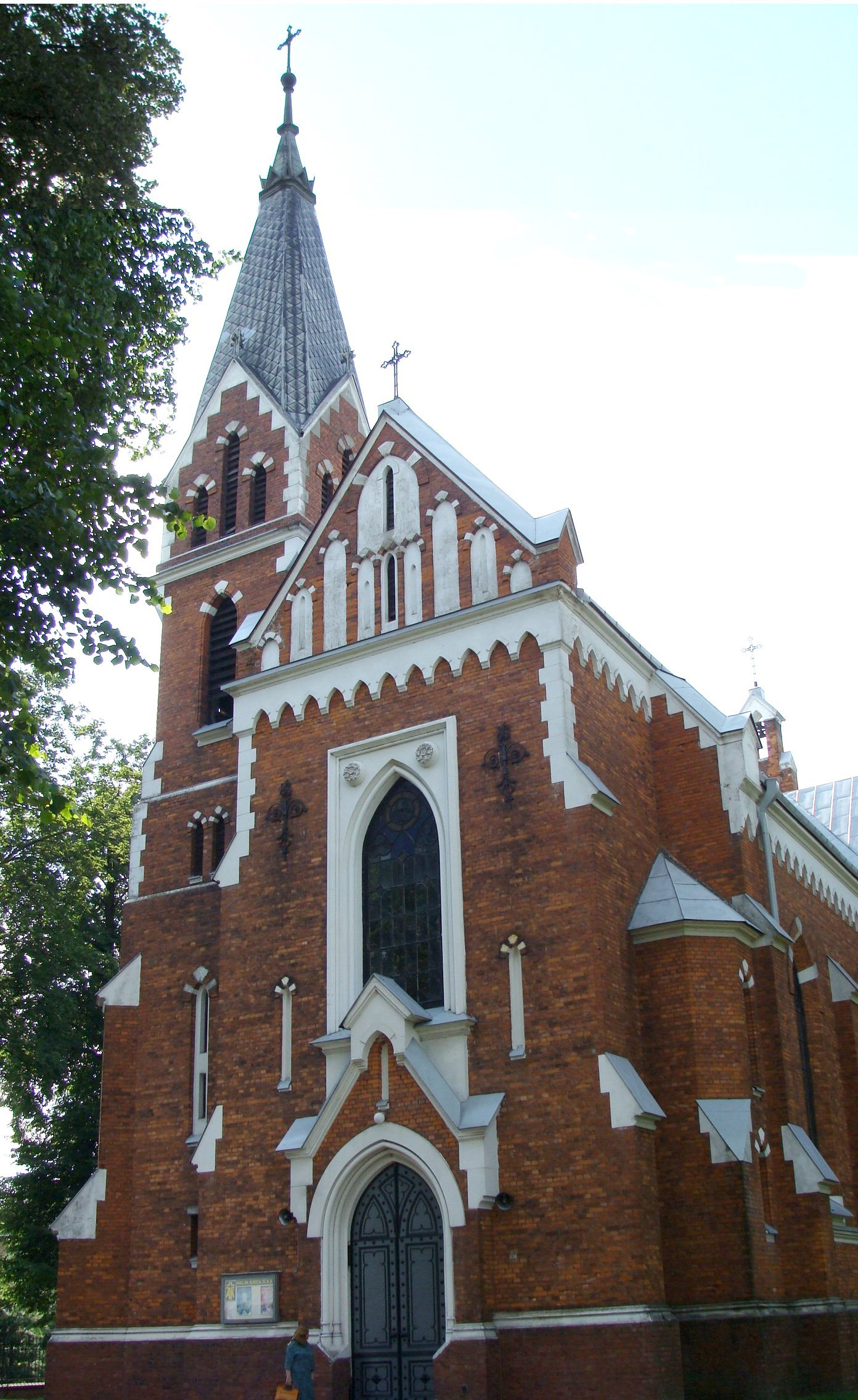
Saint Josaphat church

It was annexed by Austria in the late-18th-century Partitions of Poland. It was regained by Poles in the Austro-Polish War of 1809 and included within the short-lived Polish Duchy of Warsaw. After its dissolution in 1815, it fell to the Russian Partition of Poland. In the second half of the 19th century, a copper casting factory and two tanneries were established in Rejowiec. Rejowiec was one of many towns deprived of its town rights around 1870 as punishment for the Polish January Uprising. The biggest industrial factory in Rejowiec (until 1939) was the glass factory that employed 180 workers.

After World War I, in 1918, Poland regained independence and control of Rejowiec. On 1 January 2017, Rejowiec was granted again its town status.

=== World War II ===
During the joint German-Soviet invasion of Poland, which started World War II in September 1939, the town was invaded by Germany and then occupied until 1944. Before the invasion, the Jewish population of the town was between 2,500 and 3,500. Several Poles who were either born or lived and worked in Rejowiec were murdered by the Russians in the Katyn massacre in 1940. The director of the local sugar factory, Jan Sztaba, was among more than 115 prominent Poles from the region murdered by the Germans in Kumowa Dolina in 1940 during the AB-Aktion. Rejowiec became the location of a transit ghetto where Jews from Europe were sent. More than 5,000 Jews from Slovakia were sent to the ghetto, as well as Jews from Germany, Hungary, Czechoslovakia and other parts of occupied Poland. In April and October 1942, there were transports to Sobibor gas chambers. In May 1942, there was a transport to the Belzec extermination camp. Additionally, small groups of Jews were transported to local labor camps such located in Krychów, Sawin, Sajczyce and Chełm. In the spring of 1943, a group of 200 to 400 remaining Jews in the city were sent to Majdanek gas chambers. The Jewish community ceased to exist.

== Sports ==
The local football club is Unia Rejowiec. It competes in the lower leagues.
