= Chochołów =

Chochołów may refer to any of the two Polish rural settlements including:

- Chochołów, Lesser Poland Voivodeship (southern Poland)
- Chochołów, Łódź Voivodeship (central Poland)
