= Zagroby =

Zagroby may refer to the following places:

- Zagroby, Łódź Voivodeship (central Poland)
- Zagroby, Masovian Voivodeship (east-central Poland)
- Zagroby, Podlaskie Voivodeship (north-east Poland)
