= Marianka (disambiguation) =

Marianka is a village in Slovakia.

Marianka may also refer to the following places:

- Marianka, Biłgoraj County in Lublin Voivodeship (east Poland)
- Marianka, Lublin County in Lublin Voivodeship (east Poland)
- Marianka, Podlaskie Voivodeship (north-east Poland)
- Marianka, Gmina Strzelce in Łódź Voivodeship (central Poland)
- Marianka, Gmina Żychlin in Łódź Voivodeship (central Poland)
- Marianka, Łowicz County in Łódź Voivodeship (central Poland)
- Marianka, Opoczno County in Łódź Voivodeship (central Poland)
- Marianka, Radomsko County in Łódź Voivodeship (central Poland)
- Marianka, Skierniewice County in Łódź Voivodeship (central Poland)
- Marianka, Gmina Lubochnia, Tomaszów County in Łódź Voivodeship (central Poland)
- Marianka, Puławy County in Lublin Voivodeship (east Poland)
- Marianka, Włodawa County in Lublin Voivodeship (east Poland)
- Marianka, Gostynin County in Masovian Voivodeship (east-central Poland)
- Marianka, Gmina Kałuszyn in Masovian Voivodeship (east-central Poland)
- Marianka, Gmina Mińsk Mazowiecki in Masovian Voivodeship (east-central Poland)
- Marianka, Piaseczno County in Masovian Voivodeship (east-central Poland)
- Marianka, Żyrardów County in Masovian Voivodeship (east-central Poland)
- Marianka, Lubusz Voivodeship (west Poland)
- Marianka, Pomeranian Voivodeship (north Poland)
- Marianka, Warmian-Masurian Voivodeship (north Poland)
