= Brzeziny, Kutno County =

Brzeziny
- Village
- Location within Poland
- Coordinates: 52°12′18″N 19°40′21″E
- Country: Poland
- Voivodeship: Łódź
- County: Kutno
- Gmina: Żychlin

Brzeziny [bʐɛˈʑinɨ] is a village in the administrative district of Gmina Żychlin, within Kutno County, Łódź Voivodeship, in central Poland.
