= Gajew, Kutno County =

Gajew
- Village
- Location within Poland
- Coordinates: 52°13′47″N 19°45′23″E
- Country: Poland
- Voivodeship: Łódź
- County: Kutno
- Gmina: Żychlin
- Population: 40

Gajew [ˈɡajɛf] is a village in the administrative district of Gmina Żychlin, within Kutno County, Łódź Voivodeship, in central Poland.
