= Bukowa Mała =

- Village
- Location within Poland
- Coordinates: 51°18′N 23°31′E
- Country: Poland
- Voivodeship: Lublin
- County: Chełm
- Gmina: Sawin

Bukowa Mała [buˈkɔva ˈmawa] is a village in the administrative district of Gmina Sawin, within Chełm County, Lublin Voivodeship, in eastern Poland.
