= Szczytów =

- Village
- Location within Poland
- Coordinates: 52°13′52″N 19°43′12″E
- Country: Poland
- Voivodeship: Łódź
- County: Kutno
- Gmina: Żychlin

Szczytów [ˈʂt͡ʂɨtuf] is a village in the administrative district of Gmina Żychlin, within Kutno County, Łódź Voivodeship, in central Poland.
