= Zarębów =

- Village
- Location within Poland
- Coordinates: 52°15′N 19°42′E
- Country: Poland
- Voivodeship: Łódź
- County: Kutno
- Gmina: Żychlin

Zarębów [zaˈrɛmbuf] is a village in the administrative district of Gmina Żychlin, within Kutno County, Łódź Voivodeship, in central Poland.
