= Średni Łan =

- Village
- Location within Poland
- Coordinates: 51°18′47″N 23°29′21″E
- Country: Poland
- Voivodeship: Lublin
- County: Chełm
- Gmina: Sawin

Średni Łan (Polish pronunciation: [ˈɕrɛdɲi ˈwan]) is a village in the administrative district of Gmina Sawin, within Chełm County, Lublin Voivodeship, in eastern Poland.
