= Bachus, Lublin Voivodeship =

Bachus
- Village
- Location within Poland
- Coordinates: 51°19′18″N 23°23′43″E
- Country: Poland
- Voivodeship: Lublin
- County: Chełm
- Gmina: Sawin

Bachus [ˈbaxus] is a village in the administrative district of Gmina Sawin, within Chełm County, Lublin Voivodeship, in eastern Poland.
