= Tretki =

- Village
- Location within Poland
- Coordinates: 52°14′9″N 19°44′6″E
- Country: Poland
- Voivodeship: Łódź
- County: Kutno
- Gmina: Żychlin

Tretki [ˈtrɛtki] is a village in the administrative district of Gmina Żychlin, within Kutno County, Łódź Voivodeship, in central Poland.
