= Buszków Dolny =

- Village
- Location within Poland
- Coordinates: 52°14′44″N 19°39′55″E
- Country: Poland
- Voivodeship: Łódź
- County: Kutno
- Gmina: Żychlin
- Population: 100

Buszków Dolny [ˈbuʂkuf ˈdɔlnɨ] is a village in the administrative district of Gmina Żychlin, within Kutno County, Łódź Voivodeship, in central Poland.
