= Tomaszówka, Chełm County =

Tomaszówka
- Village
- Location within Poland
- Coordinates: 51°20′19″N 23°28′43″E
- Country: Poland
- Voivodeship: Lublin
- County: Chełm
- Gmina: Sawin

Tomaszówka [tɔmaˈʂufka] is a village in the administrative district of Gmina Sawin, within Chełm County, Lublin Voivodeship, in eastern Poland.
