= Balików =

- Village
- Location within Poland
- Coordinates: 52°14′13″N 19°41′13″E
- Country: Poland
- Voivodeship: Łódź
- County: Kutno
- Gmina: Żychlin
- Population: 100

Balików [baˈlikuf] is a village in the administrative district of Gmina Żychlin, within Kutno County, Łódź Voivodeship, in central Poland.
