= Grzybów Dolny =

- Village
- Location within Poland
- Coordinates: 52°14′N 19°45′E
- Country: Poland
- Voivodeship: Łódź
- County: Kutno
- Gmina: Żychlin
- Population: 119

Grzybów Dolny [ˈɡʐɨbuf ˈdɔlnɨ] is a village in the administrative district of Gmina Żychlin, within Kutno County, Łódź Voivodeship, in central Poland. It has had a population of 119 since 2000.
