= Budzyń, Łódź Voivodeship =

Budzyń
- Village
- Location within Poland
- Coordinates: 52°13′51″N 19°38′40″E
- Country: Poland
- Voivodeship: Łódź
- County: Kutno
- Gmina: Żychlin

Budzyń [ˈbud͡zɨɲ] is a village in the administrative district of Gmina Żychlin, within Kutno County, Łódź Voivodeship, in central Poland.
