= Jankówek, Kutno County =

Jankówek
- Village
- Location within Poland
- Coordinates: 52°15′14″N 19°35′29″E
- Country: Poland
- Voivodeship: Łódź
- County: Kutno
- Gmina: Żychlin
- Population: 40

Jankówek [janˈkuvɛk] is a village in the administrative district of Gmina Żychlin, within Kutno County, Łódź Voivodeship, in central Poland.
