= Aleksandrów, Gmina Żychlin =

Aleksandrów
- Village
- Location within Poland
- Coordinates: 52°14′22″N 19°33′58″E
- Country: Poland
- Voivodeship: Łódź
- County: Kutno
- Gmina: Żychlin

Aleksandrów [alɛkˈsandruf] is a village in the administrative district of Gmina Żychlin, within Kutno County, Łódź Voivodeship, in central Poland.

== See also ==
- List of cities and towns in Poland
