= Żabików, Łódź Voivodeship =

Żabików
- Village
- Location within Poland
- Coordinates: 52°16′18″N 19°36′38″E
- Country: Poland
- Voivodeship: Łódź
- County: Kutno
- Gmina: Żychlin

Żabików [ʐaˈbikuf] is a village in the administrative district of Gmina Żychlin, within Kutno County, Łódź Voivodeship, in central Poland.
