= Orątki Górne =

- Village
- Location within Poland
- Coordinates: 52°14′53″N 19°41′13″E
- Country: Poland
- Voivodeship: Łódź
- County: Kutno
- Gmina: Żychlin

Orątki Górne [ɔˈrɔntki ˈɡurnɛ] is a village in the administrative district of Gmina Żychlin, within Kutno County, Łódź Voivodeship, in central Poland.
