= Czesławów, Łódź Voivodeship =

Czesławów
- Village
- Location within Poland
- Coordinates: 52°14′7″N 19°32′58″E
- Country: Poland
- Voivodeship: Łódź
- County: Kutno
- Gmina: Żychlin

Czesławów (Polish pronunciation: [t͡ʂɛˈswavuf]) is a village in the administrative district of Gmina Żychlin, within Kutno County, Łódź Voivodeship, in central Poland.
