= Biała, Kutno County =

Biała
- Village
- Location within Poland
- Coordinates: 52°13′12″N 19°41′58″E
- Country: Poland
- Voivodeship: Łódź
- County: Kutno
- Gmina: Żychlin

Biała [ˈbjawa] is a village in the administrative district of Gmina Żychlin, within Kutno County, Łódź Voivodeship, in central Poland.
