= Grabów, Kutno County =

Grabów
- Village
- Location within Poland
- Coordinates: 52°13′N 19°37′E
- Country: Poland
- Voivodeship: Łódź
- County: Kutno
- Gmina: Żychlin
- Postal code: 99-319
- Vehicle registration: EKU

Grabów [ˈɡrabuf] is a village in the administrative district of Gmina Żychlin, within Kutno County, Łódź Voivodeship, in central Poland.
