= Podpakule =

- Village
- Location within Poland
- Coordinates: 51°21′51″N 23°29′11″E
- Country: Poland
- Voivodeship: Lublin
- County: Chełm
- Gmina: Sawin

Podpakule [pɔtpaˈkulɛ] is a village in the administrative district of Gmina Sawin, within Chełm County, Lublin Voivodeship, in eastern Poland. It is situated along the route of DW812, near the intersection with DW819 with Łowcza. It contains a former bar, a village road turning off DW812 leading to houses, and a bus stop.
