= Gmina Sawin =

Gmina Sawin Sawin Commune
- Gmina
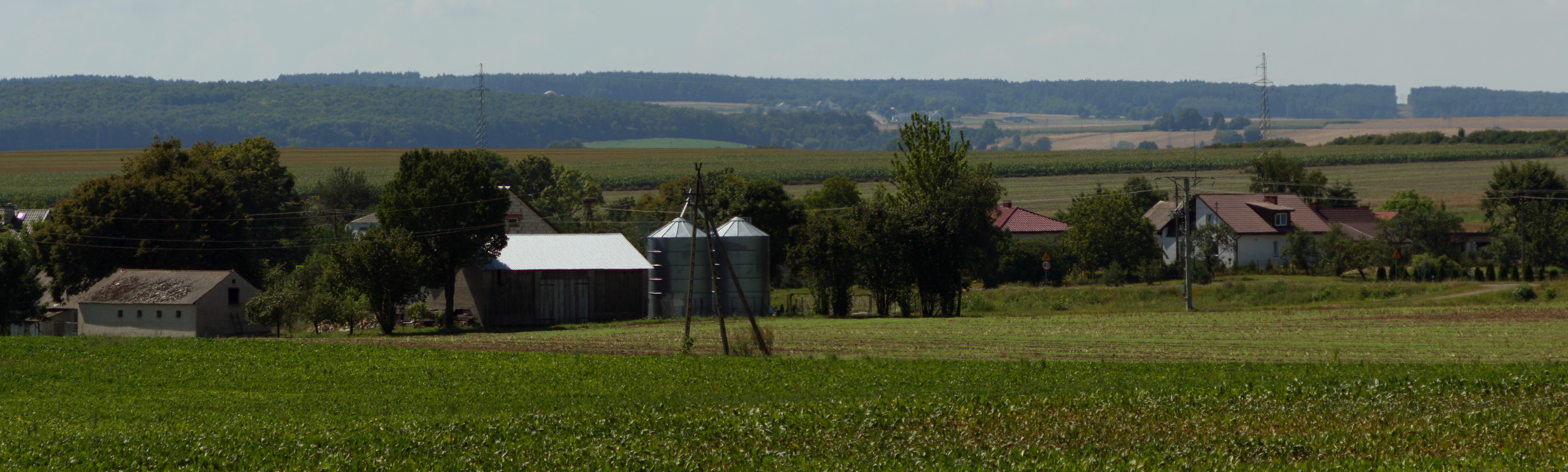

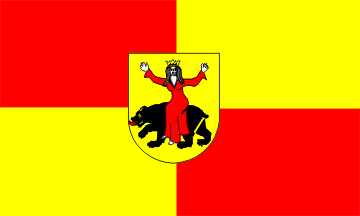
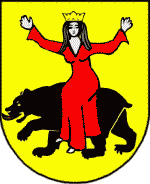
- Flag Coat of arms

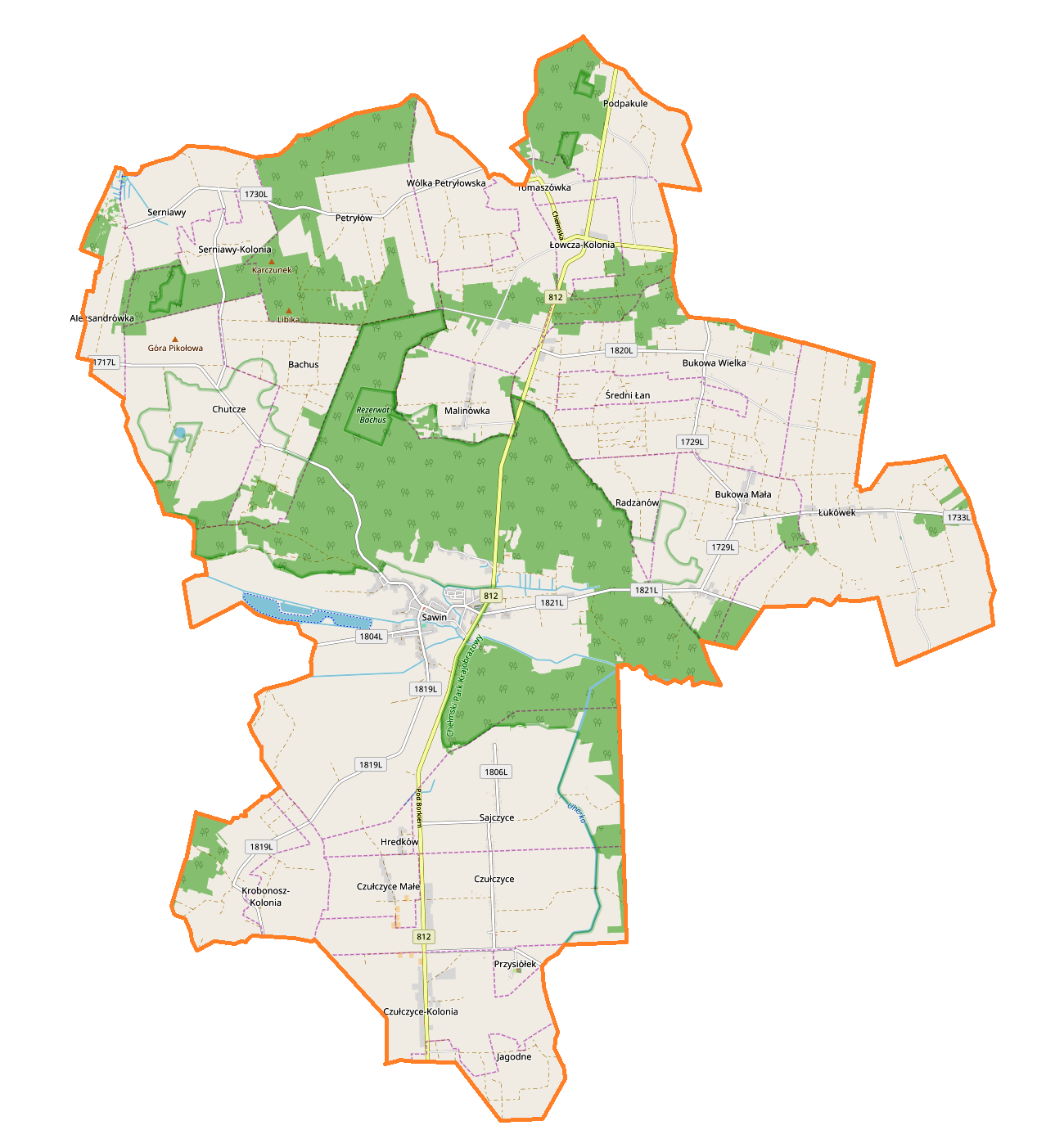
- Coordinates (Sawin): 51°16′N 23°26′E
- Country: Poland
- Voivodeship: Lublin
- County: Chełm County
- Seat: Sawin

Area
  - Total: 190.2 km^{2} (73.4 sq mi)

Population (2006)
  - Total: 5,660
  - Density: 29.8/km^{2} (77.1/sq mi)
- Website: http://www.sawin.pl

Gmina Sawin is a rural gmina (administrative district) in Chełm County, Lublin Voivodeship, in eastern Poland. Its seat is the village of Sawin, which lies approximately 14 kilometres (9 mi) north of Chełm and 61 km (38 mi) east of the regional capital Lublin.

The gmina covers an area of 190.2 square kilometres (73.4 sq mi), and as of 2006 its total population is 5,660.

== Villages ==
Gmina Sawin contains the villages and settlements of Aleksandrówka, Bachus, Bukowa Mała, Bukowa Wielka, Chutcze, Czułczyce, Czułczyce Małe, Czułczyce-Kolonia, Hredków, Jagodne, Krobonosz, Krobonosz-Kolonia, Łowcza, Łowcza-Kolonia, Łukówek, Malinówka, Petryłów, Podpakule, Przysiółek, Radzanów, Sajczyce, Sawin, Serniawy, Serniawy-Kolonia, Średni Łan, Tomaszówka and Wólka Petryłowska.

== Neighbouring gminas ==
Gmina Sawin is bordered by the gminas of Chełm, Hańsk, Ruda-Huta, Wierzbica and Wola Uhruska.
