= Łowcza-Kolonia =

- Village
- Location within Poland
- Coordinates: 51°20′39″N 23°28′31″E
- Country: Poland
- Voivodeship: Lublin
- County: Chełm
- Gmina: Sawin

Łowcza-Kolonia [ˈwɔft͡ʂa kɔˈlɔɲa] is a village in the administrative district of Gmina Sawin, within Chełm County, Lublin Voivodeship, in eastern Poland.
