= Krobonosz-Kolonia =

- Village
- Location within Poland
- Coordinates: 51°13′20″N 23°23′12″E
- Country: Poland
- Voivodeship: Lublin
- County: Chełm
- Gmina: Sawin

Population
  - Total: 52

Krobonosz-Kolonia [krɔˈbɔnɔʂ kɔˈlɔɲa] is a village in the administrative district of Gmina Sawin, within Chełm County, Lublin Voivodeship, in eastern Poland.
