= Orątki Dolne =

- Village
- Location within Poland
- Coordinates: 52°15′06″N 19°42′02″E
- Country: Poland
- Voivodeship: Łódź
- County: Kutno
- Gmina: Żychlin

Orątki Dolne [ɔˈrɔntki ˈdɔlnɛ] is a village in the administrative district of Gmina Żychlin, within Kutno County, Łódź Voivodeship, in central Poland.
