= Paseka (name) =

Paseka is a name with multiple etymologies. In parts of southern Africa, it comes from the Sesotho word for Easter. In some countries of central and eastern Europe, it means "glade, clearing" (Czech) or "apiary" (Russian), and is a cognate of Polish Pasieka.

== Given name ==
- Paseka Motsoeneng (born 1968), South African televangelist
- Paseka Sekese (born 1994), South African football midfielder

== Surname ==
- Malia Paseka (born 1994), New Zealand netball player
- Maria Paseka (born 1995), Russian artistic gymnast
