= Sokołówek, Łódź Voivodeship =

Sokołówek
- Village
- Location within Poland
- Coordinates: 52°15′39″N 19°36′29″E
- Country: Poland
- Voivodeship: Łódź
- County: Kutno
- Gmina: Żychlin

Sokołówek [sɔkɔˈwuvɛk] is a village in the administrative district of Gmina Żychlin, within Kutno County, Łódź Voivodeship, in central Poland.
