= Czułczyce Małe =

- Village
- Location within Poland
- Coordinates: 51°13′25″N 23°25′31″E
- Country: Poland
- Voivodeship: Lublin
- County: Chełm
- Gmina: Sawin

Czułczyce Małe [t͡ʂuu̯ˈt͡ʂɨt͡sɛ ˈmawɛ] is a village in the administrative district of Gmina Sawin, within Chełm County, Lublin Voivodeship, in eastern Poland.
