= Gmina Żychlin =

Gmina Żychlin Żychlin Commune
- Gmina
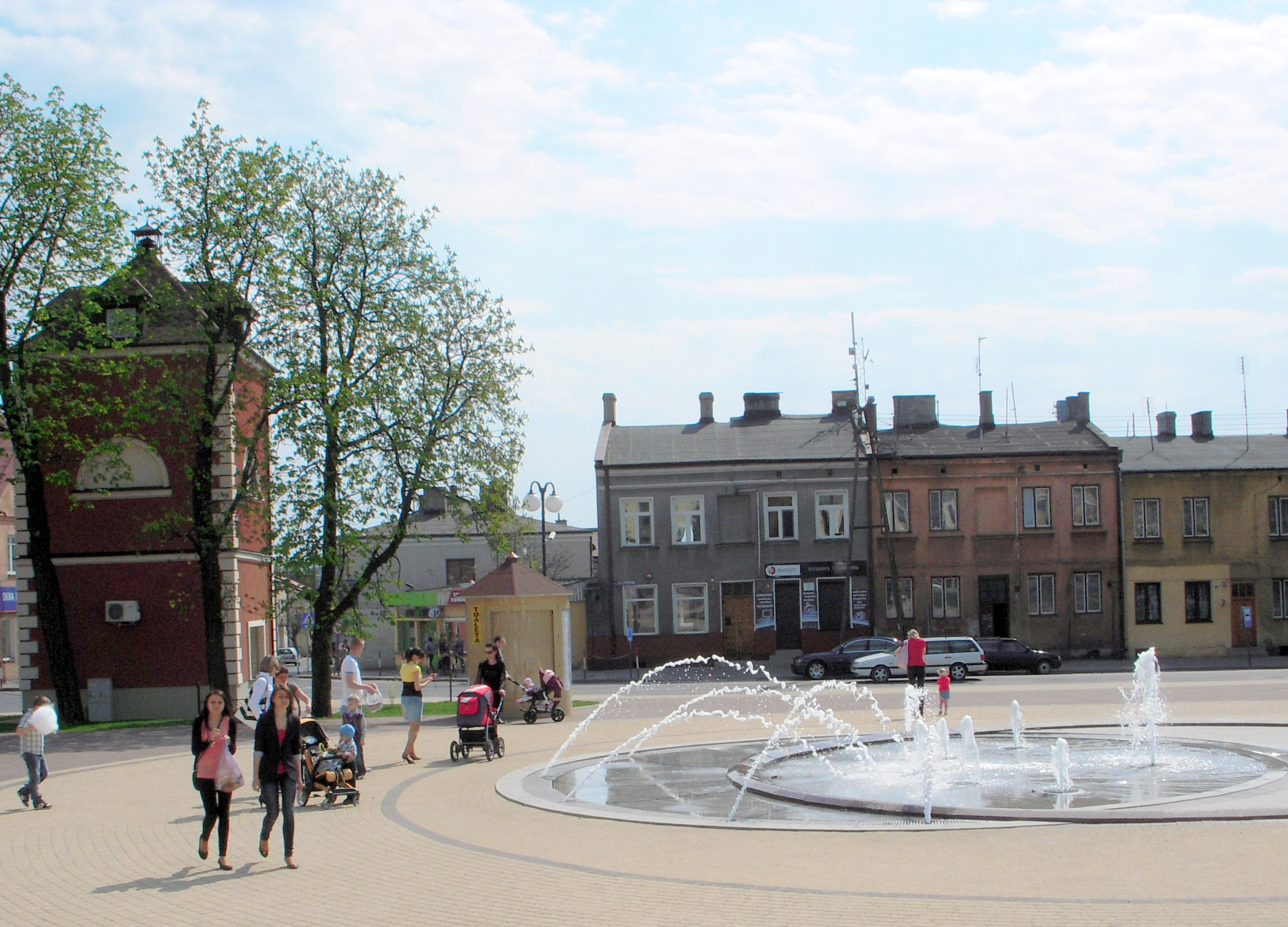

- Coat of arms
- Interactive map of Gmina Żychlin
- Coordinates (Żychlin): 52°14′43″N 19°37′25″E
- Country: Poland
- Voivodeship: Łódź
- County: Kutno
- Seat: Żychlin

Area
  - Total: 76.65 km^{2} (29.59 sq mi)

Population (2006)
  - Total: 12,984
  - Density: 169.4/km^{2} (438.7/sq mi)
  - Urban: 8,880
  - Rural: 4,104
- Website: zychlin.plocman.pl

Gmina Żychlin is an urban-rural gmina (administrative district) in Kutno County, Łódź Voivodeship, in central Poland. Its seat is the town of Żychlin, which lies 18 kilometres (11 mi) east of Kutno and 53 km (33 mi) north of the regional capital Łódź.

The gmina covers an area of 76.65 square kilometres (29.6 sq mi), and as of 2006 its total population was 12,984 (out of which the population of Żychlin amounts to 8,880, and the population of the rural part of the gmina was 4,104).

== Villages ==
Apart from the town of Żychlin, Gmina Żychlin contains the villages and settlements of;

- Aleksandrów
- Aleksandrówka
- Balików
- Biała
- Brzeziny
- Budzyń
- Buszków Dolny
- Buszkówek
- Chochołów
- Czesławów
- Dobrzelin
- Drzewoszki Małe
- Drzewoszki Wielkie
- Gajew
- Grabie
- Grabów
- Grzybów Dolny
- Grzybów Hornowski
- Jankówek
- Kaczkowizna
- Kruki
- Kurów
- Marianka
- Orątki Dolne
- Orątki Górne
- Pasieka
- Sędki
- Śleszyn
- Śleszynek
- Sokołówek
- Szczytów
- Tretki
- Wola Popowa
- Żabików
- Zagroby
- Zarębów
- Zgoda

== Neighbouring gminas ==
Gmina Żychlin is bordered by the gminas of Bedlno, Kiernozia, Oporów, Pacyna and Zduny.
