= Wola Popowa =

- Village
- Location within Poland
- Coordinates: 52°14′40″N 19°39′19″E
- Country: Poland
- Voivodeship: Łódź
- County: Kutno
- Gmina: Żychlin

Wola Popowa [ˈvɔla pɔˈpɔva] is a village in the administrative district of Gmina Żychlin, within Kutno County, Łódź Voivodeship, in central Poland.
