= Kaczkowizna =

- Village
- Location within Poland
- Coordinates: 52°15′0″N 19°44′17″E
- Country: Poland
- Voivodeship: Łódź
- County: Kutno
- Gmina: Żychlin

Kaczkowizna [kat͡ʂkɔˈvizna] is a village in the administrative district of Gmina Żychlin, within Kutno County, Łódź Voivodeship, in central Poland.
