= Przysiółek, Lublin Voivodeship =

Przysiółek
- Village
- Location within Poland
- Coordinates: 51°12′39″N 23°27′29″E
- Country: Poland
- Voivodeship: Lublin
- County: Chełm
- Gmina: Sawin

Population
  - Total: 42

Przysiółek [pʂɨˈɕuwɛk] is a village in the administrative district of Gmina Sawin, within Chełm County, Lublin Voivodeship, in eastern Poland.
