= Drzewoszki Wielkie =

- Village
- Location within Poland
- Coordinates: 52°13′47″N 19°32′27″E
- Country: Poland
- Voivodeship: Łódź
- County: Kutno
- Gmina: Żychlin

Drzewoszki Wielkie [dʐɛˈvɔʂki ˈvjɛlkʲɛ] is a village in the administrative district of Gmina Żychlin, within Kutno County, Łódź Voivodeship, in central Poland.
