= Zgoda, Gmina Żychlin =

Zgoda
- Village
- Location within Poland
- Coordinates: 52°13′30″N 19°40′9″E
- Country: Poland
- Voivodeship: Łódź
- County: Kutno
- Gmina: Żychlin

Zgoda [ˈzɡɔda] is a village in the administrative district of Gmina Żychlin, within Kutno County, Łódź Voivodeship, in central Poland.
