= Aleksandrówka, Chełm County =

Aleksandrówka
- Village
- Location within Poland
- Coordinates: 51°20′0″N 23°20′50″E
- Country: Poland
- Voivodeship: Lublin
- County: Chełm
- Gmina: Sawin

Aleksandrówka [alɛksanˈdrufka] is a village in the administrative district of Gmina Sawin, within Chełm County, Lublin Voivodeship, in eastern Poland.
