= Horní Paseka =

- Municipality
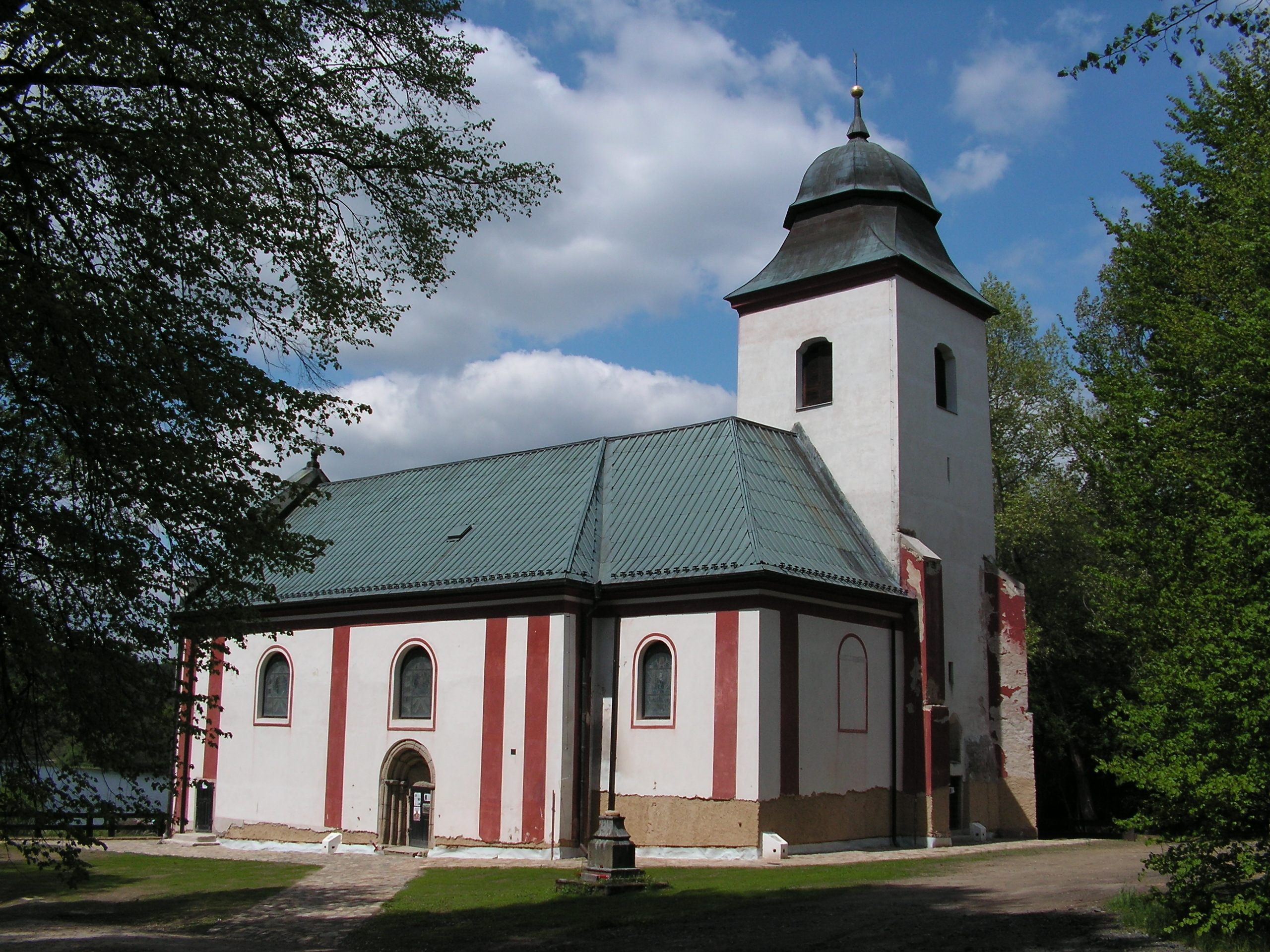
- Church of Saint Vitus

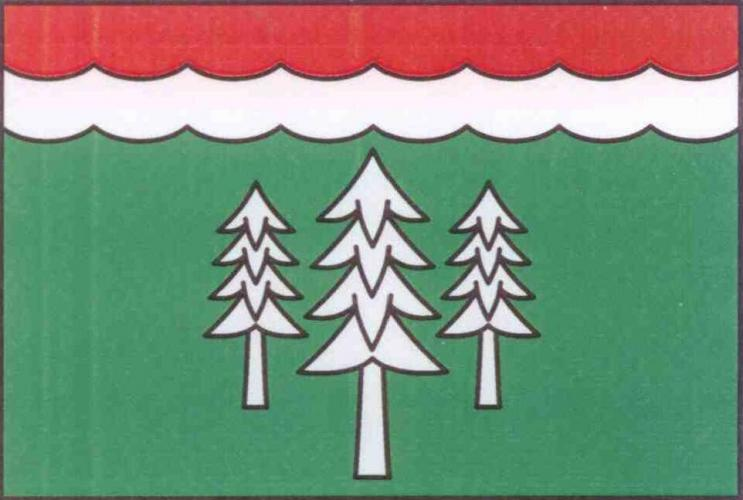
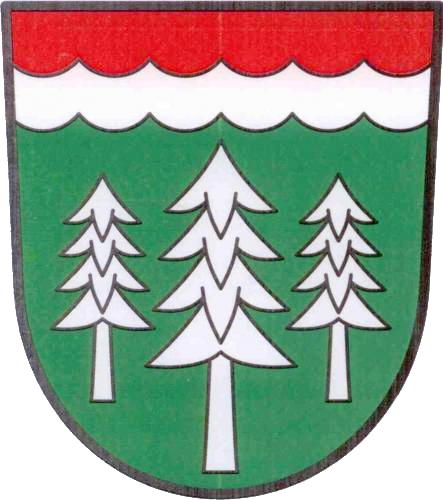
- Flag Coat of arms

- Location in the Czech Republic
- Coordinates: 49°37′47″N 15°17′36″E
- Country: Czech Republic
- Region: Vysočina
- District: Havlíčkův Brod
- First mentioned: 1265

Area
  - Total: 9.32 km^{2} (3.60 sq mi)
- Elevation: 596 m (1,955 ft)

Population (2026-01-01)
  - Total: 66
  - Density: 7.1/km^{2} (18/sq mi)
- Time zone: UTC+1 (CET)
  - Summer (DST): UTC+2 (CEST)
- Postal code: 584 01
- Website: www.hornipaseka.cz

Horní Paseka is a municipality and village in Havlíčkův Brod District in the Vysočina Region of the Czech Republic. It has about 70 inhabitants.

Horní Paseka lies approximately 23 kilometres (14 mi) west of Havlíčkův Brod, 35 km (22 mi) north-west of Jihlava, and 80 km (50 mi) south-east of Prague.

== Demographics ==
Historical population
Year	Pop.	±%
1869	1,203	—
1880	1,246	+3.6%
1890	1,226	−1.6%
1900	1,222	−0.3%
1910	1,172	−4.1%
1921	1,089	−7.1%
1930	957	−12.1%
1950	790	−17.5%
1961	804	+1.8%
1970	578	−28.1%
1980	116	−79.9%
1991	90	−22.4%
2001	71	−21.1%
2011	62	−12.7%
2021	68	+9.7%
Source: Censuses
