= Grabie, Łódź Voivodeship =

Grabie
- Village
- Location within Poland
- Coordinates: 52°14′3″N 19°40′14″E
- Country: Poland
- Voivodeship: Łódź
- County: Kutno
- Gmina: Żychlin

Grabie [ˈɡrabjɛ] is a village in the administrative district of Gmina Żychlin, within Kutno County, Łódź Voivodeship, in central Poland.
