= Aleksandrówka, Gmina Dalików, Łódź Voivodeship =

Aleksandrówka
- Village
- Location within Poland
- Coordinates: 51°55′34″N 19°01′34″E
- Country: Poland
- Voivodeship: Łódź
- County: Poddębice
- Gmina: Dalików

Aleksandrówka [alɛksanˈdrufka] is a village in the administrative district of Gmina Dalików, within Poddębice County, Łódź Voivodeship, in central Poland.
