= Śleszyn =

- Village
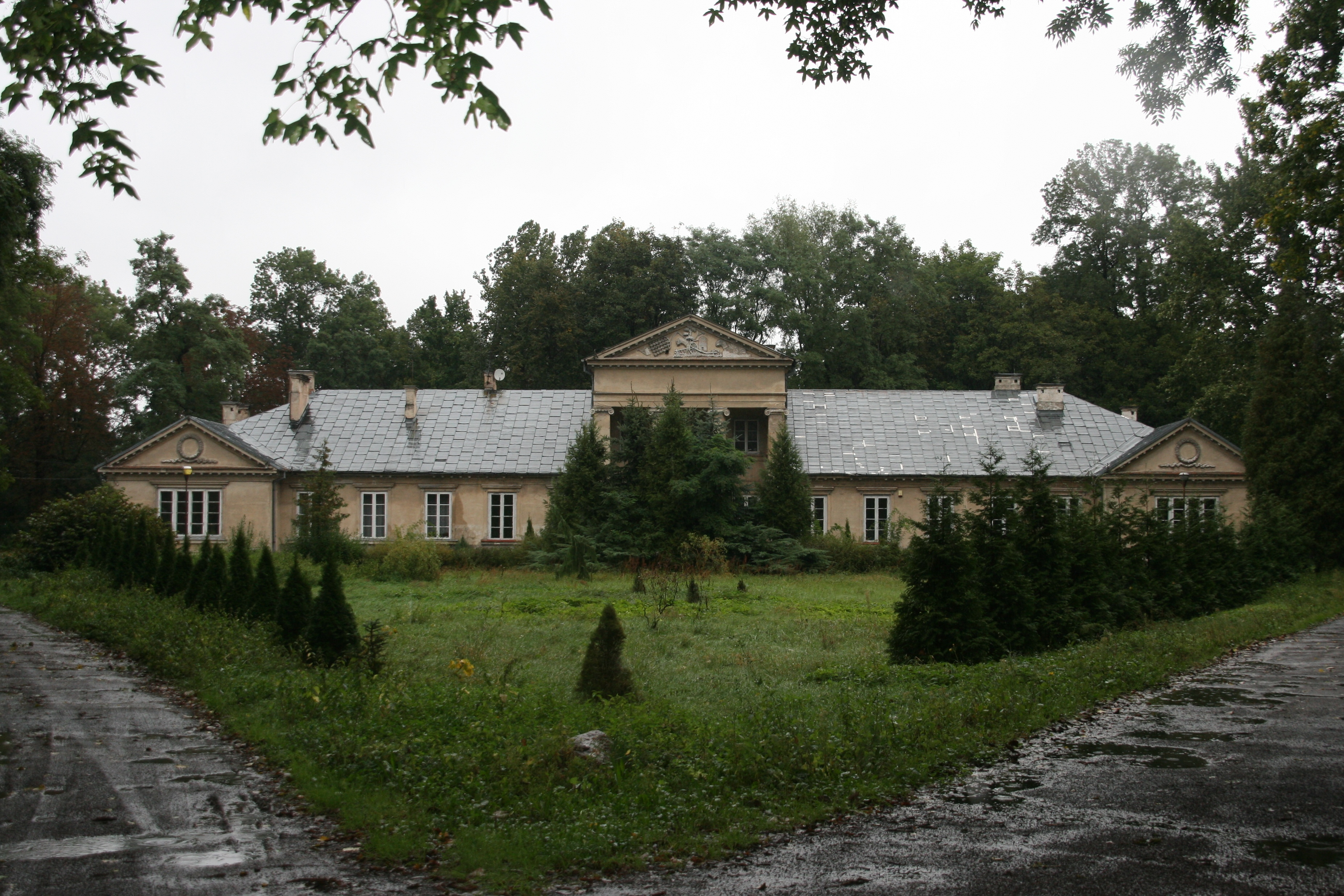
- Manor

- Location within Poland
- Coordinates: 52°12′22″N 19°41′57″E
- Country: Poland
- Voivodeship: Łódź
- County: Kutno
- Gmina: Żychlin

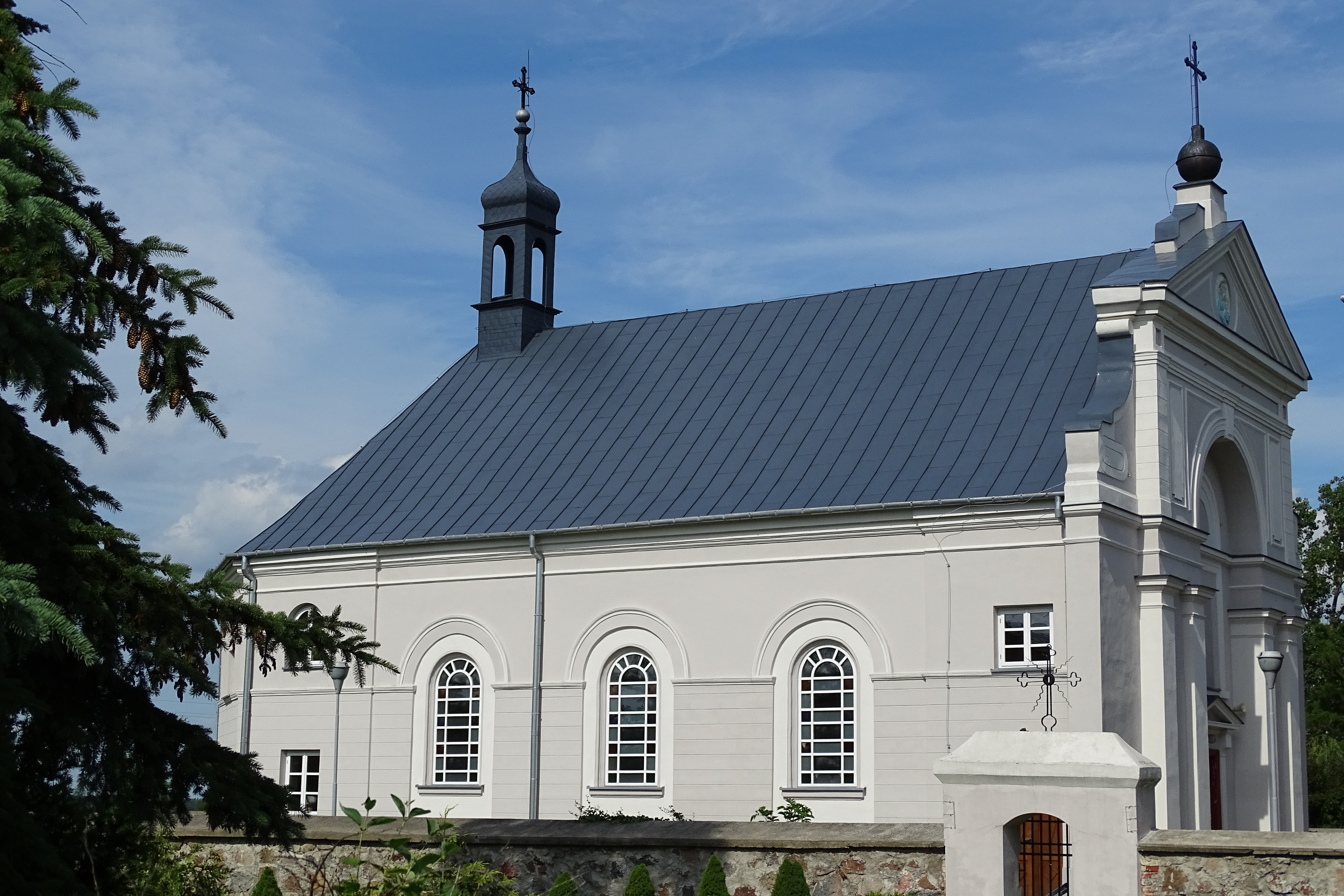
Church of Saint Alexander. Built in 1836.

Śleszyn [ˈɕlɛʂɨn] is a village in the administrative district of Gmina Żychlin, within Kutno County, Łódź Voivodeship, in central Poland.
