= Pasieka =

Pasieka may refer to:

- Pasieka, code name of the headquarters of the Szare Szeregi
- Pasieka Island, an island on the Odra River in Opole, Poland
- Pasieka, Łódź Voivodeship (central Poland)
- Pasieka, Kuyavian-Pomeranian Voivodeship (north-central Poland)
- Pasieka, Janów County in Lublin Voivodeship (east Poland)
- Pasieka, Kraśnik County in Lublin Voivodeship (east Poland)
- Pasieka, Parczew County in Lublin Voivodeship (east Poland)
- Pasieka, Podlaskie Voivodeship (north-east Poland)
- Pasieka, Greater Poland Voivodeship (west-central Poland)
- Pasieka, Silesian Voivodeship (south Poland)
- Pasieka, Pomeranian Voivodeship (north Poland)
- Pasieka, West Pomeranian Voivodeship (north-west Poland)
