= Sajczyce =

- Village
- Location within Poland
- Coordinates: 51°15′N 23°27′E
- Country: Poland
- Voivodeship: Lublin
- County: Chełm
- Gmina: Sawin

Sajczyce [sai̯ˈt͡ʂɨt͡sɛ] is a village in the administrative district of Gmina Sawin, within Chełm County, Lublin Voivodeship, in eastern Poland.
