= Aleksandrówka, Gmina Żychlin, Łódź Voivodeship =

Aleksandrówka
- Village
- Location within Poland
- Coordinates: 52°11′37″N 19°42′16.3″E
- Country: Poland
- Voivodeship: Łódź
- County: Kutno
- Gmina: Żychlin

Aleksandrówka [alɛksanˈdrufka] is a village in the administrative district of Gmina Żychlin, within Kutno County, Łódź Voivodeship, in central Poland.
