= Sawin, Lublin Voivodeship =

Sawin
- Settlement
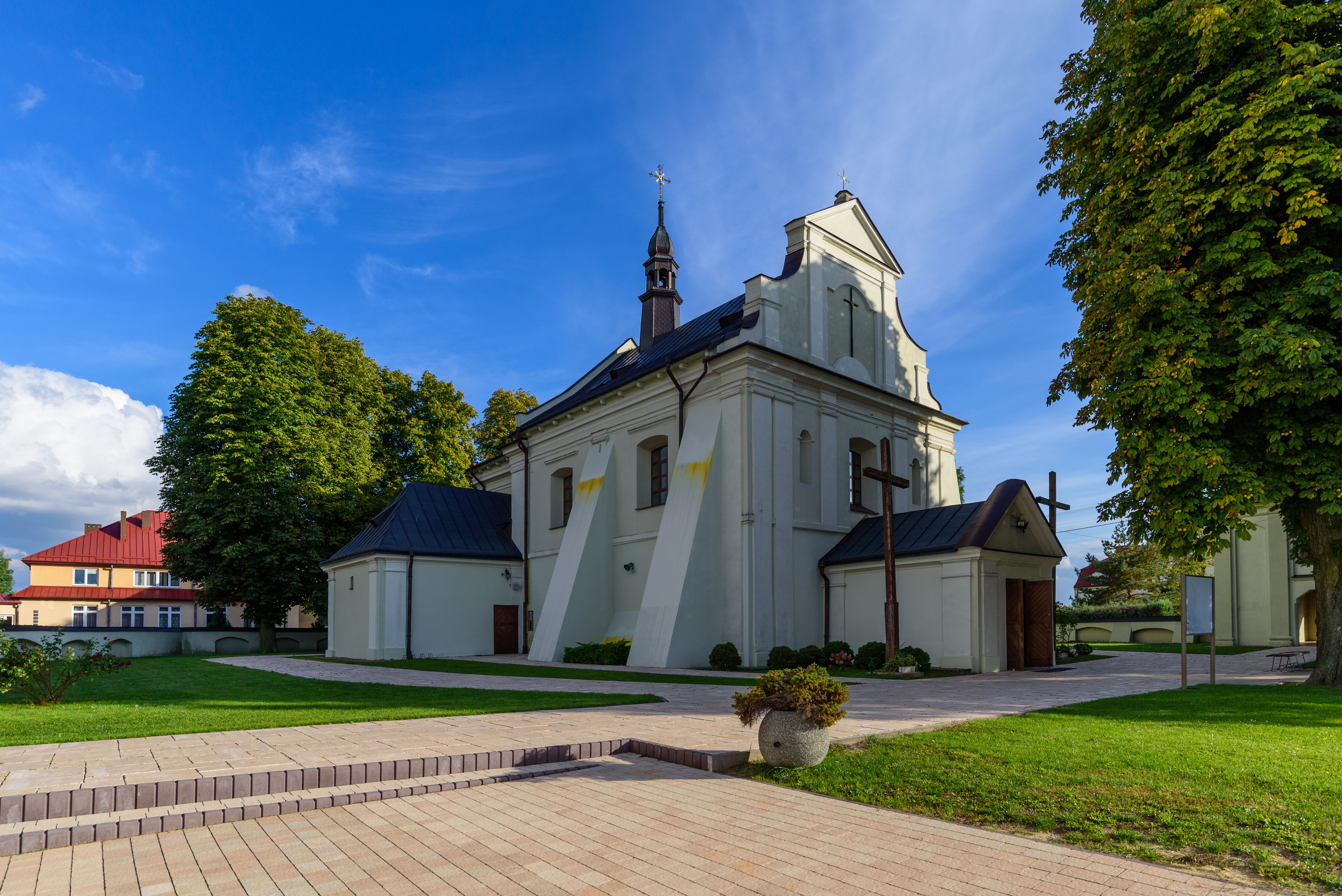
- Baroque Church of the transfiguration of Christ in Sawin

- Location within Poland
- Coordinates: 51°16′N 23°26′E
- Country: Poland
- Voivodeship: Lublin
- County: Chełm
- Gmina: Sawin

Population
  - Total: 2,181
- Time zone: UTC+1 (CET)
  - Summer (DST): UTC+2 (CEST)
- Vehicle registration: LCH
- Website: http://www.sawin.pl/

Sawin ([ˈsavin]) is a settlement in Chełm County, Lublin Voivodeship, in eastern Poland. It is the seat of the gmina (administrative district) called Gmina Sawin.

== History ==
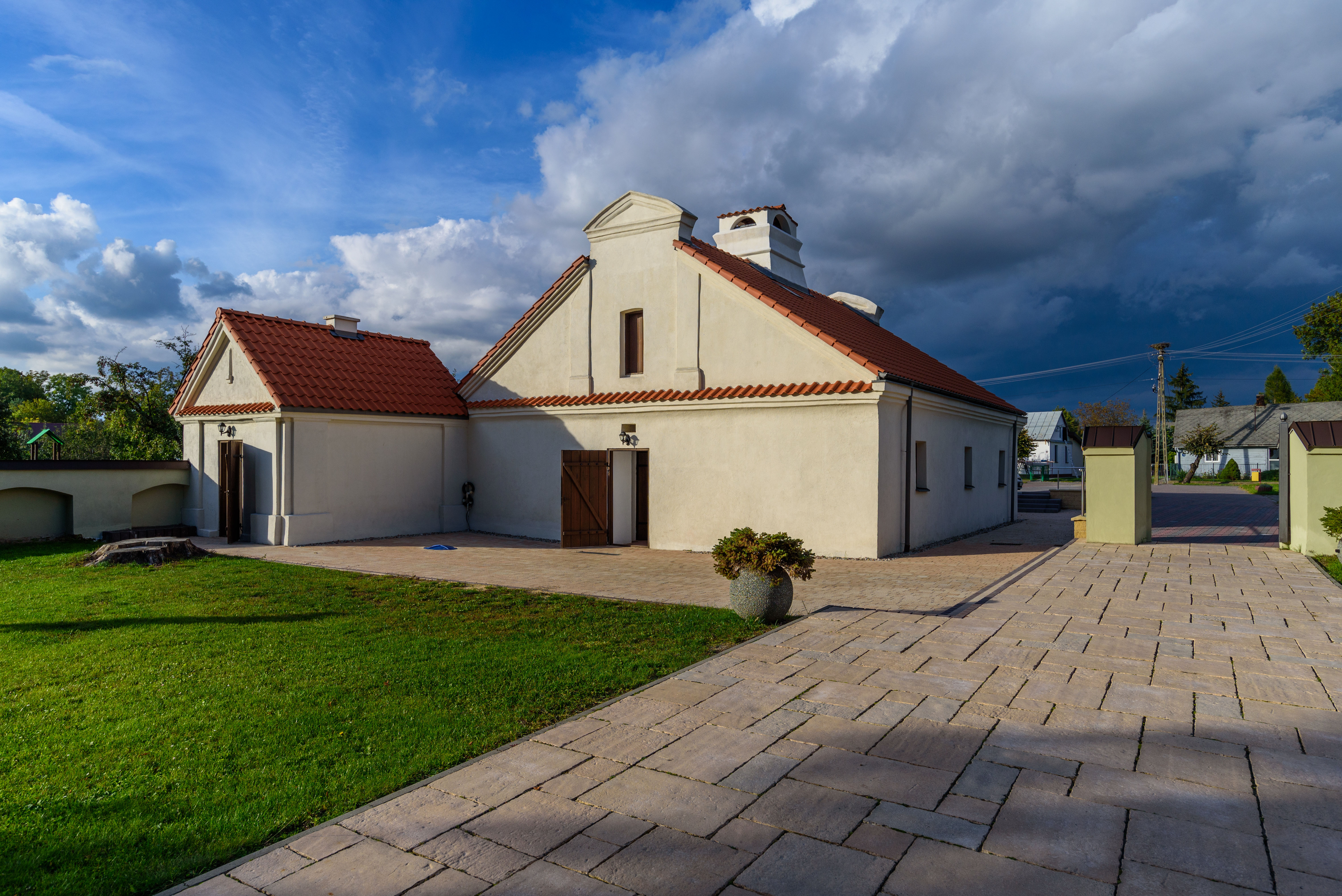
18th-century shelter for the elderly

According to the Geographical Dictionary of the Kingdom of Poland, Sawin emerged thanks to its location on the route connecting the cities of Chełm and Włodawa. It suffered two Tatar raids in the 16th century. In 1545, Bishop of Chełm Jan Dziaduski founded the local Catholic parish. King Sigismund I the Old established annual fairs in Sawin. In 1559, local citizens were expemted from tolls by his successor Sigismund II Augustus.

Following the Third Partition of Poland, in 1795, Sawin was annexed by Austria. Following the Austro-Polish War of 1809, it was regained by Poles and included within the short-lived Duchy of Warsaw, and after its dissolution it fell to the Russian Partition of Poland. In the late 19th century, the inhabitants were mostly employed in agriculture and production of carts and sleighs, sold in surrounding towns. After World War I, Poland regained independence and control of Sawin.

Following the joint German-Soviet invasion of Poland, which started World War II in September 1939, it was occupied by Germany until 1944. The occupiers exterminated local Jews in the Holocaust, and operated a subcamp of the Stalag 319 prisoner-of-war camp for Allied POWs.

=== Jewish community ===
The first Jewish synagogue was built in Sawin on Brzeskiej Street in the early 1880s. A second synagogue was built in 1925 when the 611 Jews living in the village represented 48% of total population. There were 882 Jews living in the village at the start of World War II. They included 157 traders and salesmen, 75 craftsmen, and 250 laborers.

The Jewish cemetery on the outskirts of the village, on a street called Chuteckiej, was vandalized in 1943. In 1999, Mordechai Holcblat, a Sawin native living in Israel, rectified a wooden fence. In 2001, Philip Goldstejn, a Sawin native from Canada, and Mr. Holcblat from Israel created a Holocaust memorial on stone brought from Israel. They had the cemetery cleaned and the remaining gravestones were reset.

==== The Holocaust ====
The Nazi Germans destroyed both synagogues and created a slave labor camp in November 1940 for local Jews and others from Kraków, Czechoslovakia, France, Austria, and Yugoslavia. They built drainage ditches and later were sent to extermination camps. Sawin's labor camp was closed on December 9, 1943, marching prisoners to Sobibor.

Sawin was the site of a Jewish forced labor camp established by the Germans for the purpose of improving water for the area. This camp had between 700 and 800 Jewish workers.
