= Kruki, Łódź Voivodeship =

Kruki
- Village
- Location within Poland
- Coordinates: 52°14′33″N 19°43′15″E
- Country: Poland
- Voivodeship: Łódź
- County: Kutno
- Gmina: Żychlin

Kruki [ˈkruki] is a village in the administrative district of Gmina Żychlin, within Kutno County, Łódź Voivodeship, in central Poland.
