= Dobrzelin =

- Village
- Location within Poland
- Coordinates: 52°14′N 19°37′E
- Country: Poland
- Voivodeship: Łódź
- County: Kutno
- Gmina: Żychlin
- Population: 1,400

Dobrzelin [dɔˈbʐɛlin] is a village in the administrative district of Gmina Żychlin, within Kutno County, Łódź Voivodeship, in central Poland.
