= Zagroby, Łódź Voivodeship =

Zagroby
- Village
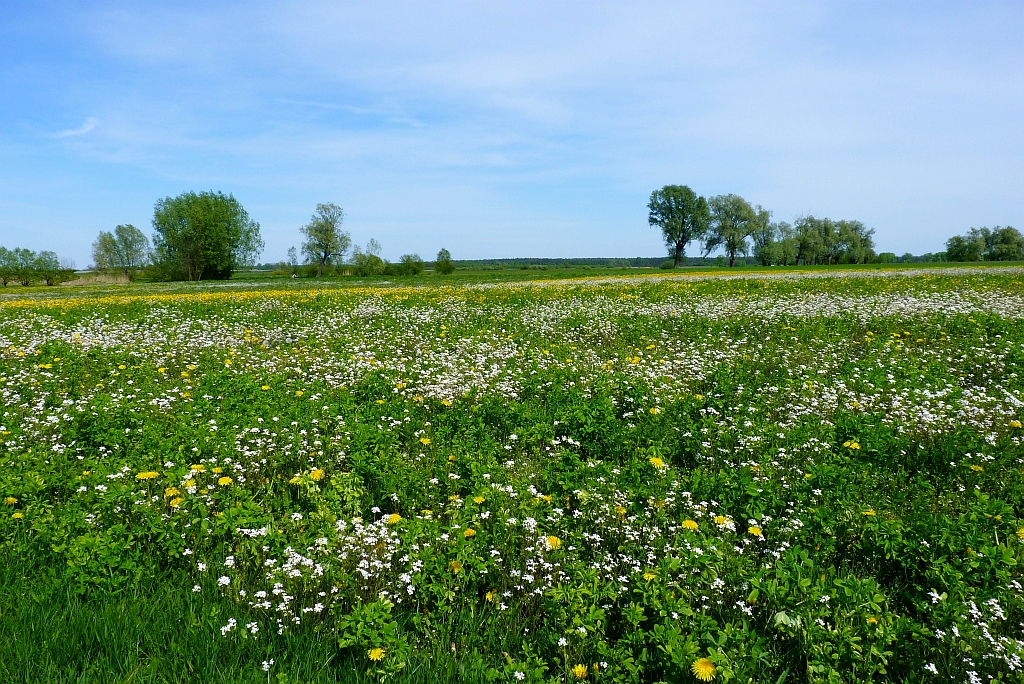

- Location within Poland
- Coordinates: 52°16′0″N 19°41′13″E
- Country: Poland
- Voivodeship: Łódź
- County: Kutno
- Gmina: Żychlin
- Population: 70

Zagroby [zaˈɡrɔbɨ] is a village in the administrative district of Gmina Żychlin, within Kutno County, Łódź Voivodeship, in central Poland.
