= Paseka (Olomouc District) =

- Municipality
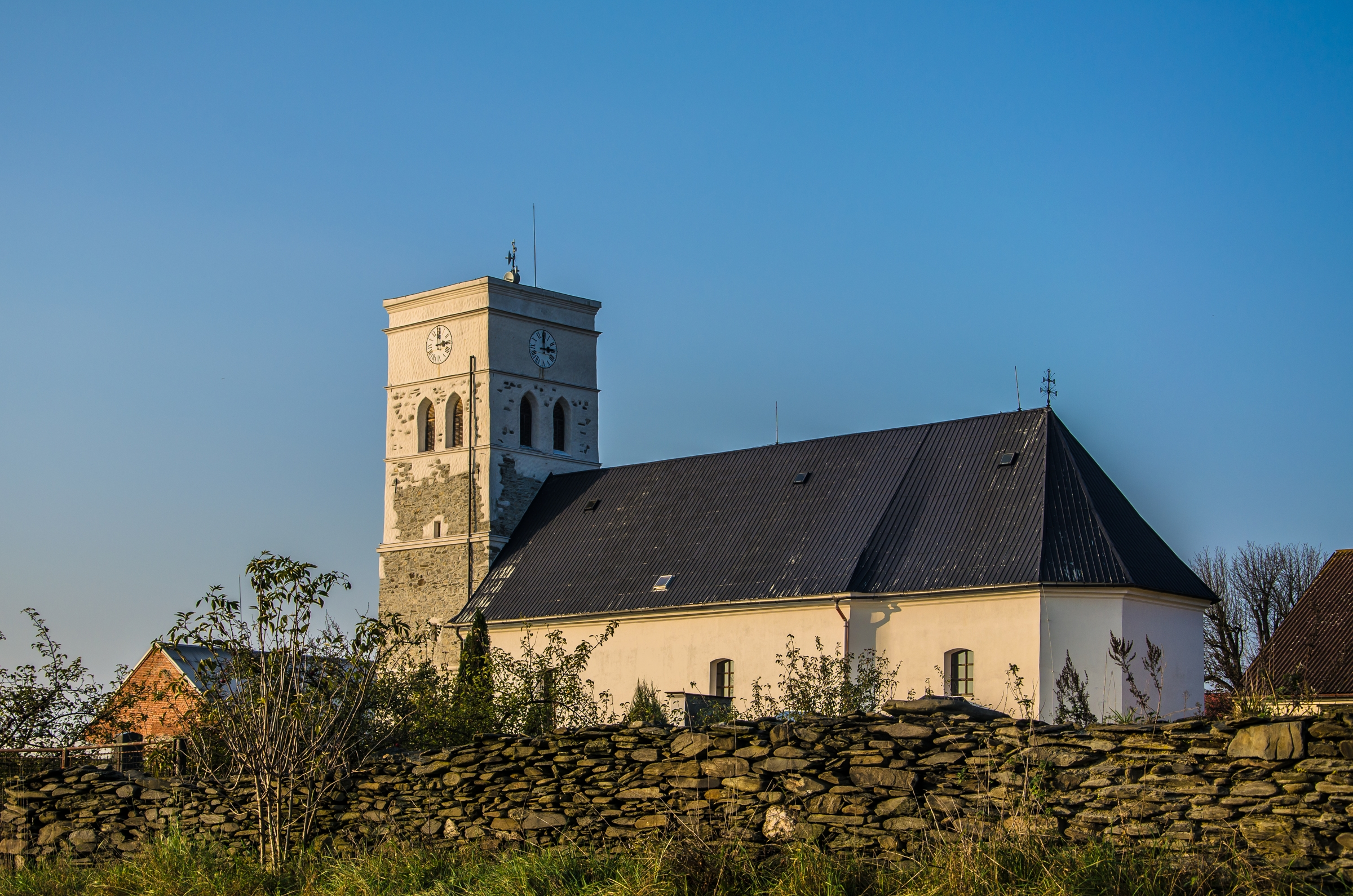
- Church of Saint Cunigunde

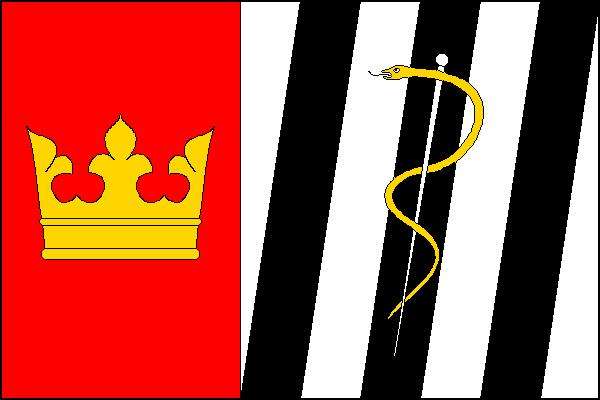
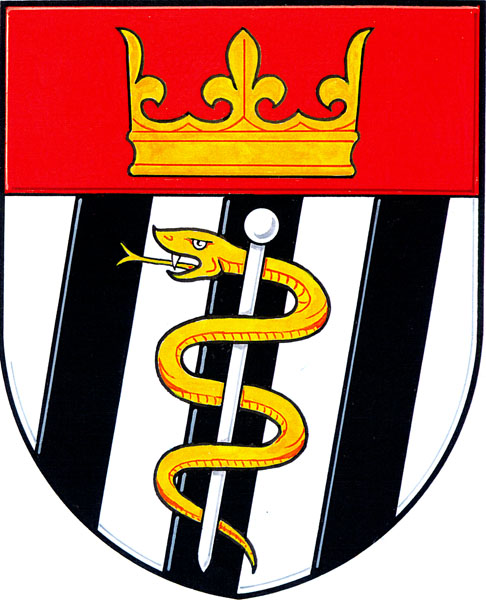
- Flag Coat of arms

- Location in the Czech Republic
- Coordinates: 49°47′47″N 17°13′22″E
- Country: Czech Republic
- Region: Olomouc
- District: Olomouc
- First mentioned: 1326

Area
  - Total: 22.84 km^{2} (8.82 sq mi)
- Elevation: 568 m (1,864 ft)

Population (2026-01-01)
  - Total: 1,266
  - Density: 55.43/km^{2} (143.6/sq mi)
- Time zone: UTC+1 (CET)
  - Summer (DST): UTC+2 (CEST)
- Postal codes: 783 86, 783 97
- Website: www.obecpaseka.cz

Paseka is a municipality and village in Olomouc District in the Olomouc Region of the Czech Republic. It has about 1,300 inhabitants.

== Administrative division ==
Paseka consists of three municipal parts (in brackets population according to the 2021 census):

- Paseka (1,269)
- Karlov (29)
- Pasecký Žleb (15)

== Etymology ==
The name Paseka means 'glade' in Czech.

== Geography ==
Paseka is located about 22 kilometres (14 mi) north of Olomouc. The western part of the municipality lies in the Upper Morava Valley, the eastern part lies in the Nízký Jeseník range. The highest point is the hill Karlovský vrch at 624 m (2,047 ft) above sea level. The village of Paseka is situated along the Teplička Stream.

== History ==
The first written mention of Paseka is from 1326. It was originally named Těchanov after its founder Těchan and renamed later in the 14th century. The hamlet of Karlov is first mentioned in 1417.

== Demographics ==
Historical population

Year	Pop.	±%
1869	1,148	—
1880	1,198	+4.4%
1890	1,197	−0.1%
1900	1,236	+3.3%
1910	1,289	+4.3%

Year	Pop.	±%
1921	1,451	+12.6%
1930	1,586	+9.3%
1950	1,408	−11.2%
1961	1,103	−21.7%
1970	1,006	−8.8%

Year	Pop.	±%
1980	1,136	+12.9%
1991	1,145	+0.8%
2001	1,152	+0.6%
2011	1,243	+7.9%
2021	1,313	+5.6%

Source: Censuses

== Economy ==
A specialised medical institute was founded here in 1915.

== Transport ==
There are no railways or major roads passing through the municipality.

== Sport ==
In Karlov is a small ski resort.

== Sights ==
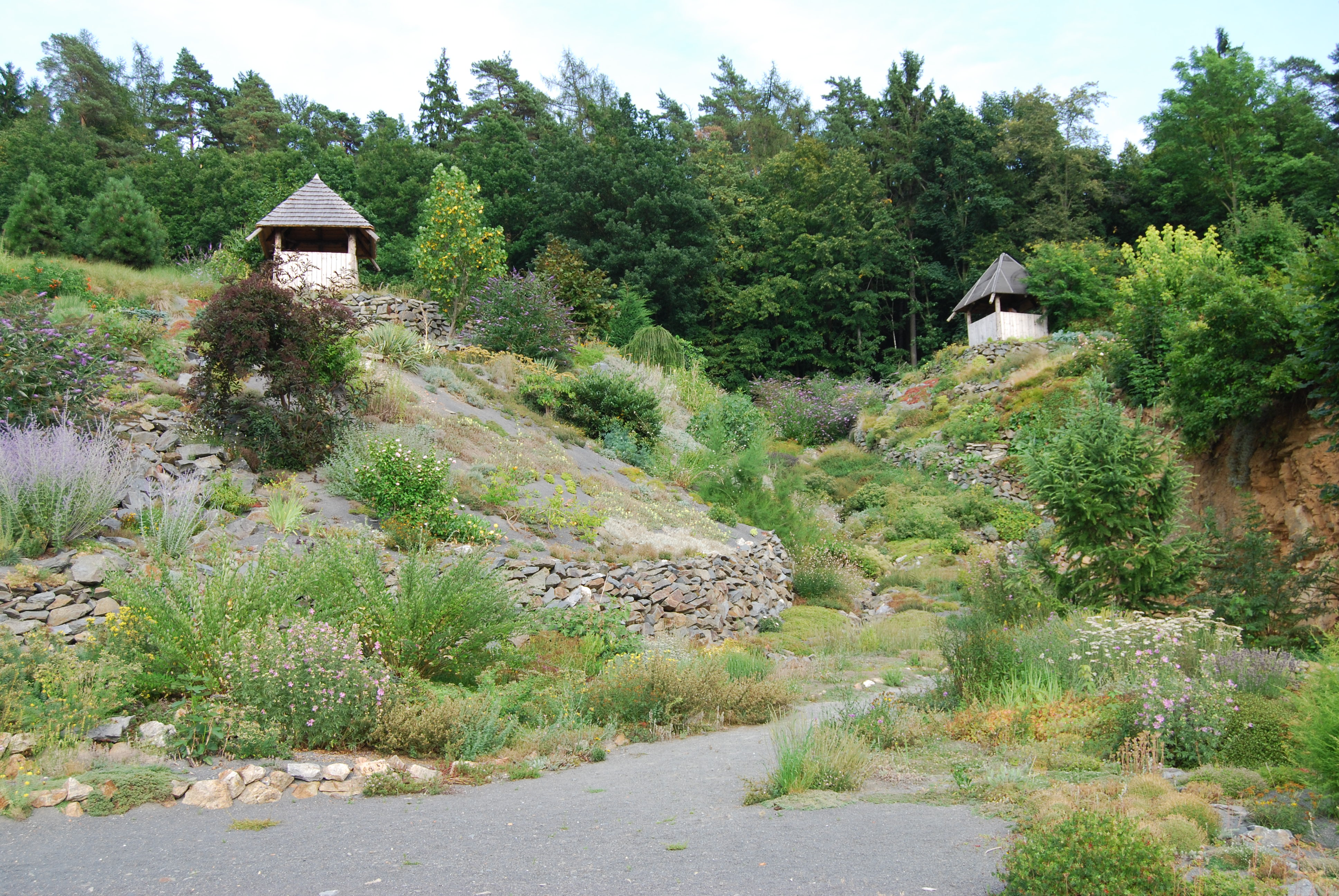
Arboretum in Paseka

The main landmark of Paseka is the Church of Saint Cunigunde. It was first mentioned in 1351 and rebuilt in 1603, when the late Renaissance tower was added, and in the Baroque style in 1784. In front of the church is a Baroque statue of Saint John of Nepomuk from 1735.

An arboretum was founded here in 2008. It is open to public from spring till autumn. Part of the specialised medical institute is a large freely accessible ornamental park.

The waterfall Pasecký vodopád is about 5-metre (16 ft)-high cascading waterfall in the valley of the Teplička.
