= Sędki, Łódź Voivodeship =

Sędki
- Village
- Location within Poland
- Coordinates: 52°15′36″N 19°43′13″E
- Country: Poland
- Voivodeship: Łódź
- County: Kutno
- Gmina: Żychlin

Sędki [ˈsɛntki] is a village in the administrative district of Gmina Żychlin, within Kutno County, Łódź Voivodeship, in central Poland.
