= Pasieka, Łódź Voivodeship =

Pasieka
- Village
- Location within Poland
- Coordinates: 52°14′41″N 19°35′41″E
- Country: Poland
- Voivodeship: Łódź
- County: Kutno
- Gmina: Żychlin

Pasieka [paˈɕɛka] is a village in the administrative district of Gmina Żychlin, within Kutno County, Łódź Voivodeship, in central Poland.
