= Koryta =

Koryta may refer to places:

== Czech Republic ==
- Koryta (Mladá Boleslav District), a municipality and village in the Central Bohemian Region
- Koryta (Plzeň-North District), a municipality and village in the Plzeň Region
- Koryta, a village and part of Bezděkov (Klatovy District) in the Plzeň Region
- Koryta, a village and part of Kostelec nad Orlicí in the Hradec Králové Region

== Poland ==
- Koryta, Łódź Voivodeship (central Poland)
- Koryta, Masovian Voivodeship (east-central Poland)
- Koryta, Podlaskie Voivodeship (north-east Poland)
- Koryta, Greater Poland Voivodeship (west-central Poland)
- Koryta, Lubusz Voivodeship (west Poland)
- Koryta, Pomeranian Voivodeship (north Poland)
- Koryta, Gmina Sierakowice in Pomeranian Voivodeship (north Poland)
