= Ecstasy of St. Francis of Assisi =

Oil painting attributed to El Greco

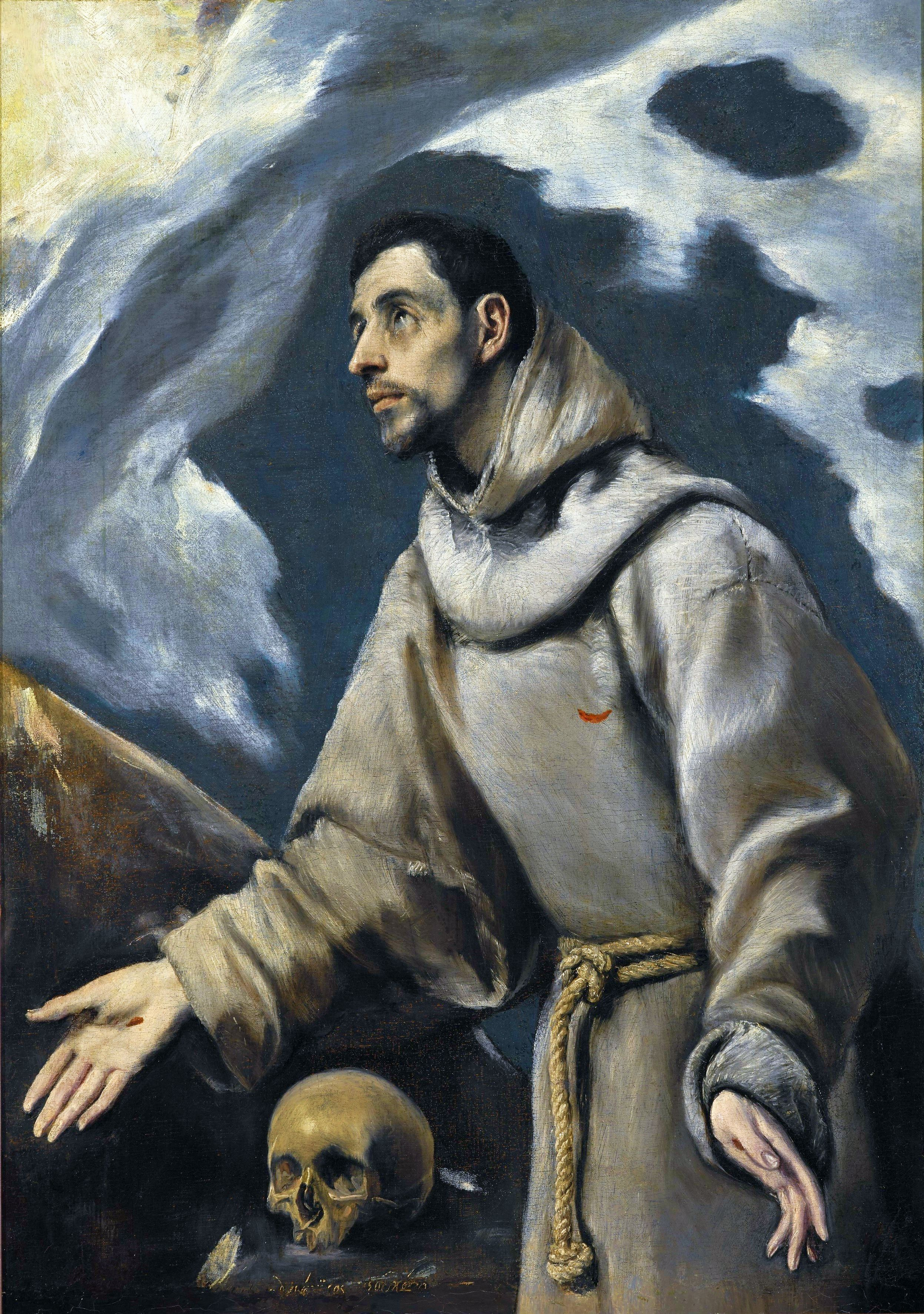
- Artist: El Greco (authorship disputed)
- Year: c. 1578
- Medium: oil on canvas
- Dimensions: 106 × 79 cm
- Location: Diocesan Museum in Siedlce, Siedlce, Poland

The Ecstasy of St. Francis of Assisi (also titled St. Francis Receiving the Stigmata) is an oil painting depicting Saint Francis of Assisi, which is attributed to the Spanish painter of Greek descent, Dominikos Theotokopoulos, known as El Greco.

The work was accidentally discovered in 1964 in Kosów Lacki by Izabella Galicka and Hanna Sygietyńska-Kwoczyńska. It is housed in the collection of the Diocesan Museum in Siedlce and was publicly exhibited only 40 years after its discovery.

== Description ==
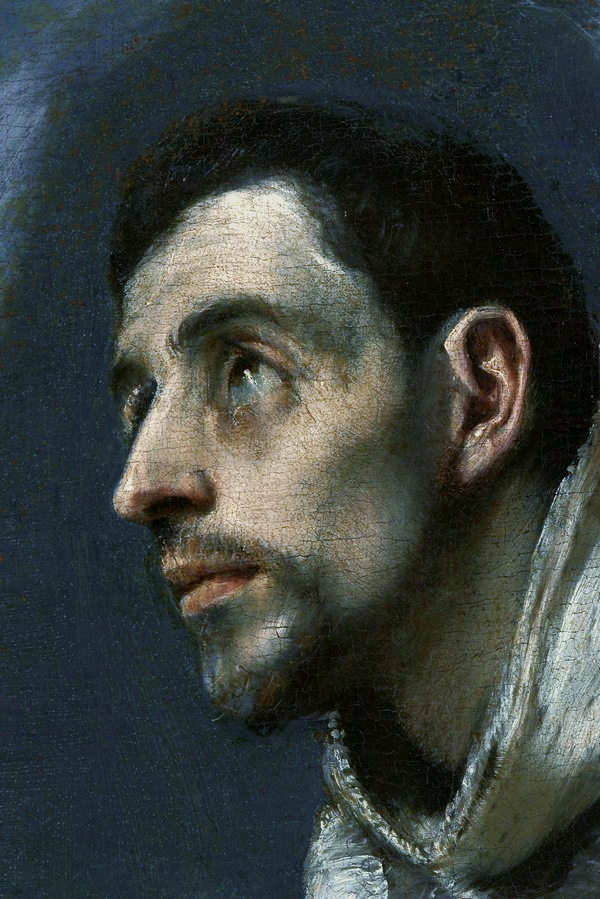
Ecstasy of St. Francis of Assisi – detail of the painting

The painting, measuring 102 (Note: One of the sources states that the height of the painting is 104 cm.) × 75 cm, was created using oil on canvas.

Saint Francis is depicted at the moment he receives the stigmata. He is shown from the knees up, leaning forward, facing three-quarters toward a bright light emanating from the left. Gazing at the sky, he has tears in his eyes. His figure is unnaturally elongated, with his arms outstretched in a gesture of surrender to God. His robe consists of a monk's habit with wide, pleated sleeves and a hooded collar, fastened with a double rope tied in a knot. In the background, the outline of the La Verna mountain is visible. Beneath his right hand, there is a skull – an attribute of vanity. The color palette of the painting is described as cold. This composition, with its radiant light and unusual coloring, portrays Saint Francis in an ecstatic, deeply spiritual manner.

The artist included two light sources in the painting: the first strongly illuminates the figure of Saint Francis, while the second emanates from a cloud just before his face.

In the mid-1970s, Polish cardiologist Professor Jan Kwoczyński published his own hypothesis that the person who posed for the painting Ecstasy of St. Francis of Assisi suffered from Marfan syndrome – a genetic connective tissue disorder. According to him, this is evidenced by the "spider-like" appearance of the fingers and the shiny lenses of the eyes. He also noted a strong resemblance between the figure of Saint Francis and one of the shepherds in the paintings Adoration of the Shepherds by Jacopo Bassano and Francesco Bassano the Younger, which were created around the same period. This resemblance could suggest that the same person posed for all three paintings. This medical hypothesis is part of the 19th-century speculations about the reasons behind the typically elongated appearance of figures in El Greco's works, (Note: Among the suggestions are those of A. Goldschmidt (1911), and later Beritens, claiming that it was the result of El Greco's supposed astigmatism, as well as the opinion of Perrera (1953), who argued that this way of depicting figures was the effect of the artist's alleged dependence on hashish.) but theories regarding the influence of factors outside the artist's conscious intention have met with strong criticism from art experts.

In 2009, the painting's value was estimated at several million dollars, and by 2016, it was valued at 5 million USD.

== Fate of the painting ==
=== Since 1952 ===
In 1964, Izabella Galicka and Hanna Sygietyńska-Kwoczyńska, researchers from the Polish Academy of Sciences' Institute of Art, (Note: For the discovery of the painting, both were awarded the Officer's Cross of the Order of Polonia Restituta on 26 March 2009 in Siedlce by the President of the Republic of Poland, Lech Kaczyński.) discovered the painting hanging on the wall of the parish house of the Church of the Nativity of the Blessed Virgin Mary in Kosów Lacki while conducting an inventory of the art monuments of the Sokołów County. The following year, they described the painting in Katalog zabytków sztuki w Polsce (Catalog of Art Monuments in Poland), attributing it to the workshop of El Greco. Seeking confirmation of their assumptions, they sent a letter to Spanish art historian Josep Gudiol Ricart from Instituto Amatller de Arte Hispánico in Barcelona, who replied:

Looking at the photograph of Saint Francis, attached to the letter of November 11, the only thing I can say about the painting, based solely on the photograph, is that it seems to be in good condition. It could be the work of El Greco himself, but I cannot give a final opinion without seeing the canvas in person. I am sorry I cannot be more precise.

On 5 May 1966, a documentary about the painting was made for the Polish Film Chronicle and broadcast on May 17 under the title Is It the Real El Greco?.

An article about the discovery of the El Greco painting was published in early March 1967 in Biuletyn Historii Sztuki, in issues from 3 to 4, under the title Nieznany obraz w Kosowie z serii franciszkańskiej El Greca (The Unknown Painting in Kosów from El Greco's Franciscan Series). Information about the discovery appeared in the press three weeks later, on April 1, initially in three newspapers: on the front page of Trybuna Ludu, in Słowo Powszechne, and in Dziennik Bałtycki. Some other periodicals dismissed the articles as an April Fools' joke.

On 5 April 1967, Wacław Kowalczuk-Kochanowski, the Chief Conservator of Monuments of the Warsaw Voivodeship, entered the painting into the registry of monuments with the following description:

The painting "Ecstasy of St. Francis of Assisi", probably created between 1570 and 1577 in El Greco's workshop, oil on canvas, dimensions 102 × 75 cm, located in the parish house in Kosów, Sokołów Podlaski County, owned by Father Władysław Stępień, residing in Kosów, Sokołów Podlaski County – parish house.

At that time, the painting was officially owned by Canon Władysław Stępień, the parish priest of the Nativity of the Blessed Virgin Mary Church in Kosów Lacki, which reduced the risk of its confiscation by the state, for example, in case of parish debts. On 1 June 1967, the painting was initially examined by Professor Bohdan Marconi and later had its paint layer analyzed by Piotr Rudniewski, who revealed significant overpainting in the upper corner of the artwork. Shortly before his death, Father Stępień made a will, in which he bequeathed the painting to the parish of Kosów.

After his death on 5 February 1968, the painting was almost immediately removed from his room by Bishop Wacław Skomorucha and Father Barbasiewicz (acting on the authority and orders of Bishop Ignacy Świrski, the Bishop of Siedlce) and secretly transported to the diocesan curia in Siedlce. On 14 February 1968, after several articles in the press speculated about the painting's fate, church authorities notified the Presidium of the Voivodeship National Council's Department of Culture in Warsaw, the Institute of Art, and the regional conservator of monuments about the actual location of the painting.

On 23 November 1973, the bishop of Siedlce, Jan Mazur, made the decision to conserve the painting. In 1974, various studies (including microchemical, X-ray, and spectrographic analyses) and conservation work were carried out at the Conservation Laboratory in Warsaw. These were performed by Zofia Marconi-Blizińska and Maria Orthwein under the supervision of Professor Bohdan Marconi. On 13 January 1974, Piotr Rudniewski informed Izabella Galicka and Hanna Sygietyńska that during the examination of the lower part of the painting, an authentic signature of El Greco – Domenikos Theotokopoulos – written in Greek minuscule, was discovered under the false overpainting of the signature A. van Dück. Based on this discovery, and considering the results of all the studies, a three-person commission from the Ministry of Culture and Art, appointed by Minister Józef Tejchma, confirmed on 30 September 1974 that the painting was indeed an original work of El Greco.

At that time, Ecstasy of St. Francis of Assisi was recognized as one of the six most valuable paintings in Poland. Later, the painting returned to the diocesan curia in Siedlce, from where it was transferred to the Diocesan Museum in 2004. For many years, it was not publicly displayed for security reasons. Church authorities were also concerned that the valuable artwork might be seized by the state or high-ranking members of the Polish United Workers' Party. In the 1970s, Bishop Jan Mazur was questioned by officers of the Security Service about the painting and its storage conditions. Some individuals also proposed purchasing the artwork.

On 1 March 1990, Professor Aleksander Gieysztor, then director of the Royal Castle in Warsaw, requested the loan of the painting for an exhibition in the Royal Chapel between November 5 and December 2 to commemorate the 450th anniversary of El Greco's birth. The request was declined by Bishop Mazur and the diocesan conservator of monuments, Father Tadeusz Kulik, who justified their refusal by citing the Code of Canon Law (canon 1292, § 2).

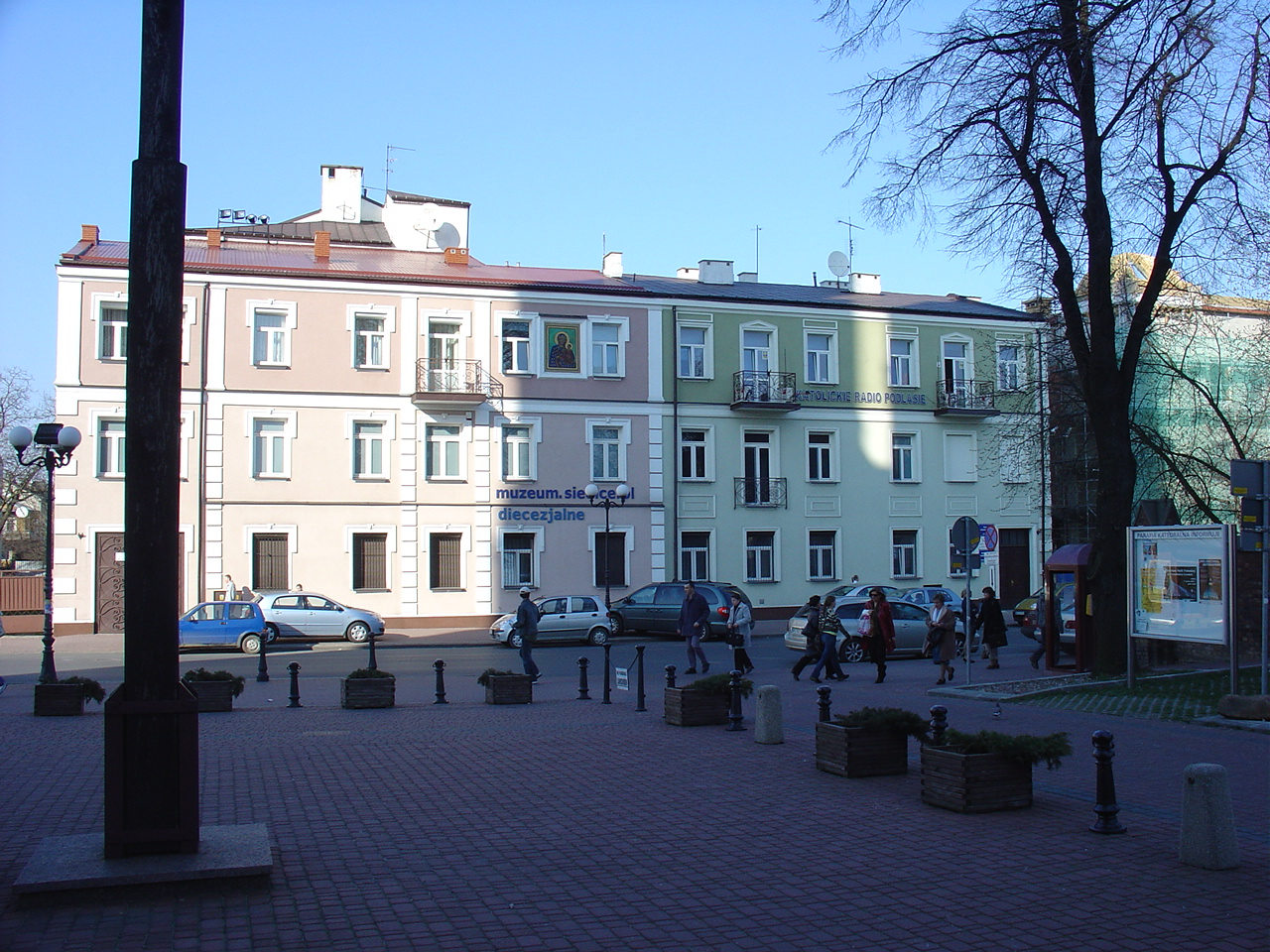
Diocesan Museum in Siedlce – location of the permanent exhibition of the painting (March 2007)

Since 15 October 2004, Ecstasy of St. Francis of Assisi has been on permanent display at the Diocesan Museum in Siedlce. This became possible only after the building was adapted to display such a valuable painting, with the costs of adaptation and security systems covered by sponsors – Totalizator Sportowy and Mostostal Siedlce. Before 2014, it was viewed by 10,000 to 30,000 museum visitors annually. By March 2009, more than 50,000 people had seen it. In 2014, in connection with the international year of El Greco, the work was shown outside Siedlce for the first time – between September 16 and October 31 at the Royal Castle in Warsaw. From February 11 to 22 March 2015, the painting was exhibited at the EUROPEUM – European Culture Centre in Kraków.

Between June 6 and 18 November 2016, the painting underwent thorough conservation, carried out at the National Museum in Kraków by a team led by chief conservator Janusz Czop. The conservation work included pressing on a backing table, filling in areas where the plaster was missing, remounting the canvas on a new wooden stretcher, varnishing, and retouching the paint layer. The edges of the canvas were uncovered and straightened, which increased the painting's size by 4 cm (width) and 2 cm (height). A false stigma on the habit, which had been added with cobalt blue in the early 19th century, was removed. A new, decorative frame was also made, which also served a protective function. It was also reported that the third word of the signature, epoiei (meaning "he made"), was deciphered, confirming the authorship of El Greco. After conservation, the painting was displayed from November 26 to 4 December 2016 at the Sukiennice Museum.

Residents of Kosów Lacki have long been seeking recognition, through the Kosów Land Association, that according to canon law, Ecstasy of St. Francis of Assisi still belongs to the Kosów parish. The same stance regarding the ownership of the painting was taken in 2004 by the diocesan bishop of Drohiczyn, Antoni Dydycz, while the then-director of the Diocesan Museum in Siedlce, Father Henryk Drozd, referred to the papal bull Totus Tuus Poloniae populus of Pope John Paul II from 25 March 1992 to argue that the painting belongs to the Siedlce curia. On 1 February 2007, the Apostolic Nunciature to Poland issued a certificate stating that from the perspective of canon law, the painting remains the property of the parish in Kosów Lacki.

=== Before 1952 ===
The fate of the painting before 1952 remains unclear. Various accounts exist, but their credibility has been questioned.

==== Elżbieta Przegalińska's version ====
According to Elżbieta Przegalińska, a resident of Łódź who gave interviews to two local newspapers in 1974 (Dziennik Łódzki in May and the socio-cultural weekly Odgłosy in November), the painting was in Spain in the early 19th century. In 1808, Walenty Skórzewski – her great-great-grandfather, a colonel of the 7th Infantry Regiment of the Duchy of Warsaw and owner of estates in Pogrzybów, Raszkówek (now part of Moszczanka), and Szczury near Ostrów Wielkopolski – purchased the painting in Spain for a significant sum during his travels in England, Portugal, and Spain. He brought it to Poland, where it was placed in the palace in Pogrzybów (now part of the neighboring village of Przybysławice).

After Walenty D. Skórzewski's death in 1846, the painting was inherited by his son Arnold Skórzewski, who moved it to Łabiszyn in Bromberg of the Grand Duchy of Posen. In 1862, Arnold's son, Kazimierz Skórzewski, inherited the painting and took it to his estate in Raszkówek.

On 16 April 1904, Kazimierz D. Skórzewski presented the painting as a wedding gift to his son Stanisław (Elżbieta Przegalińska's father) and his bride during their wedding at Wawel Cathedral. From then on, the painting was kept in the palace in Popowiczki. Due to its deteriorated condition, the Skórzewskis entrusted the painting to a painter and conservator from Poznań named Krajewski in 1912. Krajewski repainted about two-thirds of the painting, which altered its colors.

On 16 April 1914, during the 10th anniversary of their wedding, Stanisław Skórzewski – moved by the admiration expressed for the restored painting by Father Władysław Chotkowski, a guest at the celebration – removed the canvas from its frame, rolled it up, and gave it to the priest. In 1925, Franciszek Konitzer, a painter, art historian, and lecturer at the Pomeranian School of Fine Arts, visited the Skórzewski family. He conveyed a request from the then 83-year-old Father Chotkowski (who died on 13 July 1926) to return the painting to the Skórzewski family after his death. However, Stanisław Skórzewski refused, citing an honorable principle of not reclaiming gifted items. Father Chotkowski then bequeathed the painting to his pupil and friend, Father Kamieński. Before his death, Father Kamieński sold the painting to Canon Władysław Stępień, the parson of the Nativity of the Blessed Virgin Mary in Kosów Lacki from 1948 to 1968.

Dr. Izabella Galicka critically assessed the credibility of Elżbieta Przegalińska's account, raising doubts about the removal of the painting from its frame and its alleged restoration. Research conducted in the 1970s unequivocally demonstrated that the painting had not been removed from its frame in the 20th century and that the overpainting had been done no later than the 18th century. By 1974, none of the individuals who could confirm Przegalińska's account were alive – neither the painter Krajewski, nor Franciszek Konitzer (who died in 1952), nor her father, Stanisław Skórzewski (who died in 1962 from injuries sustained in a car accident). Additionally, neither the diaries of Walenty D. Skórzewski, which Przegalińska claimed to reference (possibly taken from the palace in Popowiczki by German troops on 17 December 1939 under Arthur Greiser's orders), nor the art collection catalogs compiled by Stanisław Skórzewski, have survived. Konrad Turowski, the author of one of the interviews with Przegalińska, also expressed skepticism, ending his article with the question: "Could Mrs. Przegalińska's story pertain to an entirely different painting?".

However, Przegalińska's version found at least partial confirmation in a catalog text for the Poznań exhibition Spanish Painting from the 14th to 18th Century in Polish Collections, published in 1967 (several years before her interviews). The curator, Anna Dobrzycka, suggested that the painting originated from the collection of Stanisław Skórzewski in Raszkówek, though she did not substantiate this claim with sources.

Elżbieta Przegalińska never laid claim to the painting. She revealed her version of its history in a letter to the editorial office of Życie Warszawy after reading a letter from her former teacher, Aniela Kamińska (née Bromińska, who died in 1972). Kamińska was concerned that the painting might be taken from Canon Władysław Stępień as a work of unknown provenance.

==== Father Stanisław Szepietowski's version ====
In 1974, Father Canon Stanisław Szepietowski from Szczebrzeszyn sent a letter to a priest in the Siedlce diocese, informing him that he had purchased the painting around 1927 at the Warsaw antique shop of Michał Ryka at the request of his cousin, Father Franciszek Dąbrowski, who was then the parson of the Nativity of the Blessed Virgin Mary in Kosów Lacki. (Note: There is a significant inconsistency in the priest's account – around 1927, Father Franciszek Dąbrowski was still the parson of the Assumption of the Blessed Virgin Mary Parish in Parysów, and he only became the parish priest of Kosów Lacki on 12 December 1934. Therefore, either Ecstasy of St. Francis of Assisi could not have been in Kosów Lacki before that date, or it must have been purchased after 11 December 1934.) In response to a letter from Izabella Galicka and Hanna Sygietyńska, Father Szepietowski wrote:

I kindly inform you that the painting of St. Francis was owned by the late Father Franciszek Dąbrowski, my cousin. He purchased the painting from Mr. Ryka, an antique dealer in Warsaw. Father Franciszek Dąbrowski was the parson in Kosów Lacki. He passed the painting on to his successor, Father Prałat Kamiński, and Father Kamiński's successor, Father Canon Stępień, allegedly – as he himself said – purchased the painting from Father Prałat Kamiński. [...] If the esteemed ladies are in Lublin or Zamość, please inform me in advance, and I will be happy to meet you.

It is not entirely clear who personally made the purchase at the antique shop: Father Stanisław Szepietowski or Father Franciszek Dąbrowski. Izabella Galicka and Hanna Sygietyńska found that Michał Ryka's antique shop was located at 8 Bracka Street in Warsaw before the war, and after the owner's death in 1930, it was run by his wife Maria, née Schoenborn. Her father had been the administrator of the Lubomirski estates and forests in Kruszyna near Częstochowa. Based on this, they hypothesized that the painting may have previously belonged to the Lubomirski family, who may have put it up for sale in the well-known antique shop in the 1920s. However, they were unable to meet with Father Szepietowski, as he died in 1977 at the age of 92.

According to the housekeeper, Marta Smagała, before his death, Father Szepietowski donated his entire collection of paintings, including The Bernardine Tasting Wine in the Cellar, which had been purchased at the same time as Ecstasy of St. Francis of Assisi from Michał Ryka's antique shop, to the Society of Friends of Kazimierz (of which Father Szepietowski had been the first president). His collection later ended up in a museum or memory room in Kazimierz.

After the painting was rediscovered by Galicka and Sygietyńska, Father Władysław Stępień, the parson of Kosów Lacki, claimed that it had been found among junk in the bell tower during Father Kamiński's tenure as parson. Father Stępień later hung the painting in one of his rooms, saving it from being burned along with moldy vestments.

In 2004, Father Prałat Zbigniew Borkowski, a former vicar of the Kosów Lacki parish, confirmed Father Szepietowski's version, adding more detailed circumstances surrounding the purchase of the painting by Father Stępień from Father Kamiński.

==== Other versions ====
In other sources, there are reports that the artwork came to Poland under unclear circumstances, with the authors relying on assumptions and raising many questions. Some of the information shows some similarity to the versions of Elżbieta Przegalińska and Father Stanisław Szepietowski. It was suspected, among other things, that the painting:

- could have been brought by a soldier of the Napoleonic army, who, on his way east, left it in the Tosie estate, intending to retrieve it after returning from the Russian campaign;
- could have been brought from Spain by Count Wincenty Krasiński, the owner of the village of Sterdyń near Kosów Lacki, after returning from the Battle of Somosierra and found its way to the nearby Tosie estate; there, in the 1920s, it was reportedly owned by Piotr Bujalski, who did not realize the value of the painting, allowing it to be auctioned off (the painting also failed to attract the attention of the auctioneer); it was then said to have been purchased in 1927 at a Warsaw antique shop, possibly for the then-parson of Kosów Lacki, Father Franciszek Dąbrowski;
- could have been donated to the local parish (in Kosów Lacki) in 1927 during the sale of the Tosie estate by its owner (version by Halina Krukowska from Bartoszyce, granddaughter of the Tosie estate owner, published in 1992 in Gazeta Wyborcza);
- could have belonged to one of the noble art collections – the Krasiński family, the Ossolińskis, or the Radziwiłł family;
- could have been purchased, likely by Father Stanisław Szepietowski, at an antique shop in the late 1930s (and thus not around 1927, as Father Szepietowski claimed), and from there, it made its way to Kosów Lacki.

== Controversies surrounding authorship ==
Despite research and expert opinions, the debate over the authenticity of the artwork has persisted almost continuously since it was attributed to El Greco. However, there is no information indicating that such expert assessments or studies have been conducted outside of Poland or by foreign specialists focused on El Greco's work.

The discovery of the painting was a great sensation and led to numerous visits from historians and art experts, many of whom questioned the authorship of the piece, including Professor Marek Rostworowski, Professor Stanisław Lorentz, Professor Jan Białostocki, Anna Dobrzycka, and others.

In 1967, amidst widespread disbelief about the painting's authorship, a comment appeared in the catalogue of the Poznań exhibition Spanish Painting of the 14th–18th Centuries in Polish Collections by its curator, Anna Dobrzycka: "The awkwardness and rigidity of the drawing do not allow us to attribute [it] to either the master [El Greco] or his circle". Similar opinions were expressed by other authorities in the field of art history at the time, including Jan Białostocki and Marek Rostworowski. In 1974, a ministerial commission, in which Professor Białostocki participated, confirmed El Greco's authorship.

In 2014, Dr. Mieczysław Morka – an art historian and former employee of the Institute of Art at the Polish Academy of Sciences, who had questioned the authenticity of paintings from the Museum of John Paul II Collection in the 1990s – challenged the authorship of Ecstasy of St. Francis of Assisi. This led to further research being commissioned by the management of the Diocesan Museum in Siedlce.

According to Dr. Morka, the painting was inventoried between 1952 and 1954, but the historian of art responsible for the inventory at that time, Bogusław Kopydłowski, attributed its authorship to the Dutch painter Gerard van Honthorst. According to Izabella Galicka's account, Kopydłowski did not even mention the Ecstasy of St. Francis of Assisi painting in his preliminary inventory, let alone attribute it to Honthorst. Galicka also noted that Kopydłowski, who was a curator at the Warsaw National Museum, would never have mistaken El Greco for the Flemish Honthorst.

Dr. Morka reaffirmed his position at a press conference on 22 June 2015 at the Diocesan Museum in Siedlce, dedicated to the results of the painting's expert evaluations conducted after the One Painting exhibition at the Royal Castle in 2014. In response to information from Piotr Frączek from the Laboratory of Analysis and Non-Destructive Testing of Heritage Objects at the National Museum in Kraków and Professor Iwona Szmelter from the Department of Conservation and Restoration of Art Works at the Academy of Fine Arts in Warsaw, who stated that the painting was undoubtedly an original by El Greco, Dr. Morka commented: "It has not been possible to conclusively determine whether the signature on the painting is authentic".

== Painting in culture ==
- In the 1960s, Ludwik Jerzy Kern published a satirical poem about the confusion surrounding the discovery of Ecstasy of St. Francis of Assisi in Przekrój.
- In 1967, Ryszard Marek Groński published a satirical poem titled Obraz in Szpilki.
- On 21 April 1984, Polish Post issued a postage stamp featuring Ecstasy of St. Francis of Assisi (designed by Jacek Konarzewski, with a nominal value of 27 old złotys) as part of the World Philatelic Exhibition in Spain. The stamp remained in circulation until the end of 1994.
- In 2007, a youth novel titled Pan Samochodzik i... El Greco (Vol. 93 of the Pan Samochodzik i... series) by Jakub Czarny was published by the Warmia Publishing House. In the novel, the painting is stolen from the museum in Siedlce.
- In 2014, the Siedlce Scientific Society published the book El Greco z Kosowa Lackiego by Izabella Galińska and Hanna Sygietyńska, in which the authors describe the circumstances of the painting’s discovery and their struggle to have El Greco recognized as its creator.
- On 2 September 2017, Polish Post presented and issued a new postage stamp featuring Ecstasy of St. Francis of Assisi (designed by Ewa Szydłowska, nominal value of 2.60 PLN) as part of the European Art in Polish Collections series, in cooperation with the Diocesan Museum in Siedlce.

== Bibliography ==
- Kowalska, Karolina (2018). Polski El Greco [Polish El Greco] (in Polish). Warsaw: Iskry. ISBN 978-83-244-1010-1.
- Mirończuk, Robert (2014). Matwiejuk, Kazimierz (ed.). "Arcydzieło El Greca Ekstaza św. Franciszka" [The Masterpiece of El Greco: The Ecstasy of St. Francis] (PDF). Teologiczne Studia Siedleckie (in Polish). 11. Siedlce: Wyższe Seminarium Duchowne im. Jana Pawła II Diecezji Siedleckiej. ISSN 1733-7496.
