= KOPY =

KOPY may refer to:

- KOPY (AM), a radio station (1070 AM) licensed to Alice, Texas, United States
- KOPY-FM, a radio station (92.1 FM) licensed to Alice, Texas, United States

== See also ==
- Kopy, a village in Łódź Voivodeship in central Poland
