= Zieleniew =

Zieleniew may refer to the following places:

- Zieleniew, Gmina Krośniewice in Łódź Voivodeship (central Poland)
- Zieleniew, Gmina Krzyżanów in Łódź Voivodeship (central Poland)
- Zieleniew, Łęczyca County in Łódź Voivodeship (central Poland)
