= Głogowa =

Głogowa may refer to the following places:

- Głogowa, Koło County in Greater Poland Voivodeship (central Poland)
- Głogowa, Gmina Raszków, Ostrów County in Greater Poland Voivodeship (west-central Poland)
- Głogowa, Łódź Voivodeship (central Poland)
- Głogowa, Turek County in Greater Poland Voivodeship (central Poland)
