= Nowe (disambiguation) =

Nowe may refer to:

== Places ==
- Nowe in Kuyavian-Pomeranian Voivodeship (north-central Poland)
- Nowe, Łódź Voivodeship (central Poland)
- Nowe, Świętokrzyskie Voivodeship (south-central Poland)
- Nowe, Greater Poland Voivodeship (west-central Poland)

== People ==
- Ann Nowé, Belgian computer scientist
