= Łubno =

Łubno may refer to the following places in Poland:

- Łubno, Lublin Voivodeship (east Poland)
- Łubno, Łódź Voivodeship (central Poland)
- Łubno, Świętokrzyskie Voivodeship (south-central Poland)
- Łubno, Subcarpathian Voivodeship (south-east Poland)
- Łubno, Masovian Voivodeship (east-central Poland)
- Łubno, Greater Poland Voivodeship (central Poland)
- Łubno, Pomeranian Voivodeship (north Poland)

== See also ==
- Lubno (disambiguation)
