= Moszczanka =

Moszczanka may refer to the following places:

- Moszczanka, Greater Poland Voivodeship (west-central Poland)
- Moszczanka, Lublin Voivodeship (east Poland)
- Moszczanka, Opole Voivodeship (south-west Poland)
