= Jacków =

Jacków may refer to the following places:

- Jacków, Łęczyca County in Łódź Voivodeship (central Poland)
- Jacków, Radomsko County in Łódź Voivodeship (central Poland)
- Jacków, Lublin Voivodeship (east Poland)
- Jacków, Silesian Voivodeship (south Poland)
