= Drogosław =

Drogosław may refer to the following places in Poland:

- Drogosław, Greater Poland Voivodeship, a village
- Drogosław, Kuyavian-Pomeranian Voivodeship, a village
- Drogosław, Nowa Ruda, a district of Nowa Ruda, Lower Silesian Voivodeship
