= Cygany =

Cygany may refer to the following places:

- Cygany, Łódź Voivodeship (central Poland)
- Cygany, Masovian Voivodeship (east-central Poland)
- Cygany, Subcarpathian Voivodeship (south-east Poland)
- Cygany, Pomeranian Voivodeship (north Poland)
- Cygany, Polish name for Tsyhany (western Ukraine)
