= Pawlikowice =

Pawlikowice may refer to the following places in Poland:

- Pawlikowice, Lower Silesian Voivodeship (south-west Poland)
- Pawlikowice, Kutno County in Łódź Voivodeship (central Poland)
- Pawlikowice, Pabianice County in Łódź Voivodeship (central Poland)
- Pawlikowice, Lesser Poland Voivodeship (south Poland)
