= Luboradz =

Luboradz may refer to the following places in Poland:

- Luboradz, Lower Silesian Voivodeship (south-west Poland)
- Luboradz, Łódź Voivodeship (central Poland)
- Luboradz, West Pomeranian Voivodeship (north-west Poland)
