= Pniewko =

Pniewko may refer to the following places:

- Pniewko, Łódź Voivodeship (central Poland)
- Pniewko, Gryfice County in West Pomeranian Voivodeship (north-west Poland)
- Pniewko, Gryfino County in West Pomeranian Voivodeship (north-west Poland)
