= Zosin =

Zosin may refer to the following places:

- Zosin, Golub-Dobrzyń County in Kuyavian-Pomeranian Voivodeship (north-central Poland)
- Zosin, Włocławek County in Kuyavian-Pomeranian Voivodeship (north-central Poland)
- Zosin, Hrubieszów County in Lublin Voivodeship (east Poland)
- Zosin, Krasnystaw County in Lublin Voivodeship (east Poland)
- Zosin, Lublin County in Lublin Voivodeship (east Poland)
- Zosin, Łódź Voivodeship (central Poland)
- Zosin, Łęczna County in Lublin Voivodeship (east Poland)
- Zosin, Gmina Opole Lubelskie in Opole County, Lublin Voivodeship (east Poland)
- Zosin, Ryki County in Lublin Voivodeship (east Poland)
- Zosin, Masovian Voivodeship (east-central Poland)
- Zosin, Greater Poland Voivodeship (west-central Poland)
