= Ogrodzona =

Ogrodzona may refer to the following villages in Poland:

- Ogrodzona, Łęczyca County in Łódź Voivodeship (central Poland)
- Ogrodzona, Piotrków County in Łódź Voivodeship (central Poland)
- Ogrodzona, Silesian Voivodeship (south Poland)
