= Sulisław =

Sulisław may refer to:

- Sulisław, Greater Poland Voivodeship (west-central Poland)
- Sulisław, Opole Voivodeship (south-west Poland)
- Sulisław, West Pomeranian Voivodeship (north-west Poland)
- Sulisław of Cracow (died 1241), Polish nobleman
