= Skrzynki =

Skrzynki may refer to the following places:

- Skrzynki, Świecie County in Kuyavian-Pomeranian Voivodeship (north-central Poland)
- Skrzynki, Włocławek County in Kuyavian-Pomeranian Voivodeship (north-central Poland)
- Skrzynki, Łęczyca County in Łódź Voivodeship (central Poland)
- Skrzynki, Tomaszów County in Łódź Voivodeship (central Poland)
- Skrzynki, Masovian Voivodeship (east-central Poland)
- Skrzynki, Ostrzeszów County in Greater Poland Voivodeship (west-central Poland)
- Skrzynki, Gmina Kórnik in Greater Poland Voivodeship (west-central Poland)
- Skrzynki, Gmina Stęszew in Greater Poland Voivodeship (west-central Poland)
