= Gąsiorów =

Gąsiorów may refer to the following places:

- Gąsiorów, Jarocin County in Greater Poland Voivodeship (west-central Poland)
- Gąsiorów, Koło County in Greater Poland Voivodeship (central Poland)
- Gąsiorów, Łódź Voivodeship (central Poland)
