= Lipówka =

Lipówka may refer to the following places:

- Lipówka, Łódź Voivodeship (central Poland)
- Lipówka, Lublin Voivodeship (east Poland)
- Lipówka, Podlaskie Voivodeship (north-east Poland)
- Lipówka, Świętokrzyskie Voivodeship (south-central Poland)
- Lipówka, Greater Poland Voivodeship (west-central Poland)
- Lipówka, Warmian-Masurian Voivodeship (north Poland)
