= Milonice =

Milonice may refer to places:

== Czech Republic ==
- Milonice (Blansko District), a municipality and village in the South Moravian Region
- Milonice (Vyškov District), a municipality and village in the South Moravian Region

== Poland ==
- Miłonice, a village in Łódź Voivodeship
