= Suchodoły =

Suchodoły may refer to the following places:

- Suchodoły, Krasnystaw County in Lublin Voivodeship (east Poland)
- Suchodoły, Kraśnik County in Lublin Voivodeship (east Poland)
- Suchodoły, Podlaskie Voivodeship (north-east Poland)
- Suchodoły, Łódź Voivodeship (central Poland)
- Suchodoły, Gmina Kętrzyn in Warmian-Masurian Voivodeship (north Poland)
- Suchodoły, Gmina Srokowo in Warmian-Masurian Voivodeship (north Poland)
