= Józefów, Gmina Raszków =

Józefów
- Village
- Location within Poland
- Coordinates: 51°43′35″N 17°42′02″E
- Country: Poland
- Voivodeship: Greater Poland
- County: Ostrów
- Gmina: Raszków

Józefów (Polish pronunciation: [juˈzɛfuf]) is a village in the administrative district of Gmina Raszków, within Ostrów County, Greater Poland Voivodeship, in west-central Poland.
