= Ostałów, Łódź Voivodeship =

Ostałów
- Village
- Location within Poland
- Coordinates: 52°15′16″N 19°6′27″E
- Country: Poland
- Voivodeship: Łódź
- County: Kutno
- Gmina: Krośniewice
- Population: 160

Ostałów [ɔsˈtawuf] is a village in the administrative district of Gmina Krośniewice, within Kutno County, Łódź Voivodeship, in central Poland.
