= Jelitów, Greater Poland Voivodeship =

Village in Poland

Jelitów
- Village
- Location within Poland
- Coordinates: 51°41′N 17°45′E
- Country: Poland
- Voivodeship: Greater Poland
- County: Ostrów
- Gmina: Raszków
- Website: http://www.jelitow.prv.pl/

Jelitów [jɛˈlituf] is a village in the administrative district of Gmina Raszków, within Ostrów County, Greater Poland Voivodeship, in west-central Poland.
