= Kajew, Łódź Voivodeship =

Kajew
- Village
- Location within Poland
- Coordinates: 52°16′31″N 19°9′52″E
- Country: Poland
- Voivodeship: Łódź
- County: Kutno
- Gmina: Krośniewice

Kajew [ˈkajɛf] is a village in the administrative district of Gmina Krośniewice, within Kutno County, Łódź Voivodeship, in central Poland.
