= Janice, Łódź Voivodeship =

Janice
- Village
- Location within Poland
- Coordinates: 52°09′02″N 19°13′01″E
- Country: Poland
- Voivodeship: Łódź
- County: Łęczyca
- Gmina: Daszyna

Janice [jaˈnit͡sɛ] is a village in the administrative district of Gmina Daszyna, within Łęczyca County, Łódź Voivodeship, in central Poland.
