= Jaskółki, Gmina Raszków =

Jaskółki
- Village
- Location within Poland
- Coordinates: 51°41′10″N 17°44′50″E
- Country: Poland
- Voivodeship: Greater Poland
- County: Ostrów
- Gmina: Raszków
- Population: 500

Jaskółki [jasˈkuu̯ki] is a village in the administrative district of Gmina Raszków, within Ostrów County, Greater Poland Voivodeship, in west-central Poland.
