= Daszyna =

- Village
- Location within Poland
- Coordinates: 52°10′N 19°11′E
- Country: Poland
- Voivodeship: Łódź
- County: Łęczyca
- Gmina: Daszyna
- Population (approx.): 600

Daszyna [daˈʂɨna] is a village in Łęczyca County, Łódź Voivodeship, in central Poland. It is the seat of the gmina (administrative district) called Gmina Daszyna.

The village has an approximate population of 600.
