= Cudniki =

- Village
- Location within Poland
- Coordinates: 52°12′44″N 19°8′33″E
- Country: Poland
- Voivodeship: Łódź
- County: Kutno
- Gmina: Krośniewice
- Population: 40

Cudniki [t͡sudˈniki] is a village in the administrative district of Gmina Krośniewice, within Kutno County, Łódź Voivodeship, in central Poland.
