= Ligota, Gmina Raszków =

Ligota
- Village
- Location within Poland
- Coordinates: 51°47′N 17°41′E
- Country: Poland
- Voivodeship: Greater Poland
- County: Ostrów
- Gmina: Raszków

Ligota [liˈɡɔta] is a village in the administrative district of Gmina Raszków, within Ostrów County, Greater Poland Voivodeship, in west-central Poland.
