= Mazew =

- Village
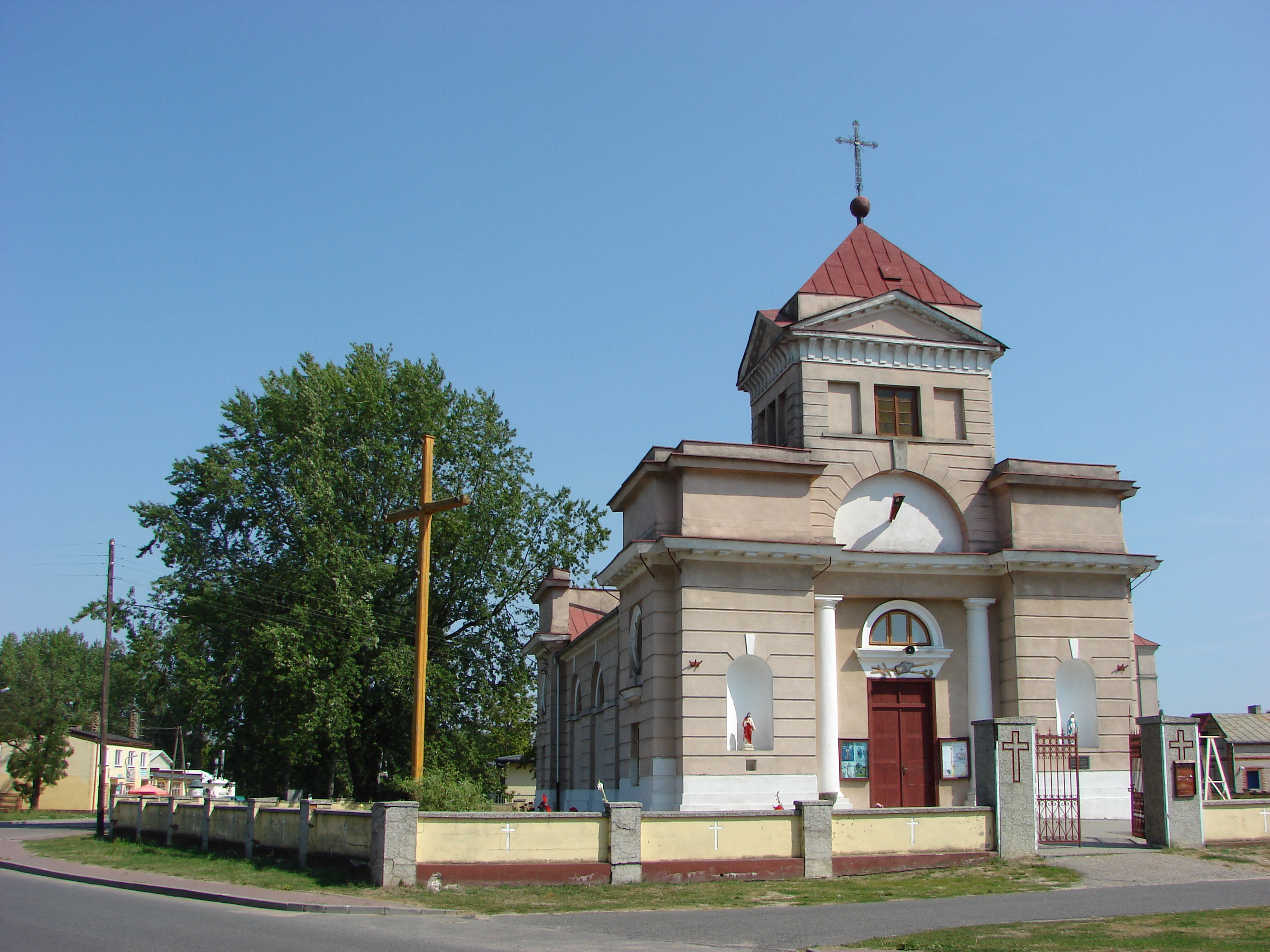
- Parish church of St John the Baptist from 1830

- Location within Poland
- Coordinates: 52°10′N 19°7′E
- Country: Poland
- Voivodeship: Łódź
- County: Łęczyca
- Gmina: Daszyna
- Population: 304

Mazew [ˈmazɛf] is a village in the administrative district of Gmina Daszyna, within Łęczyca County, Łódź Voivodeship, in central Poland.
