= Stary Sławoszew =

- Village
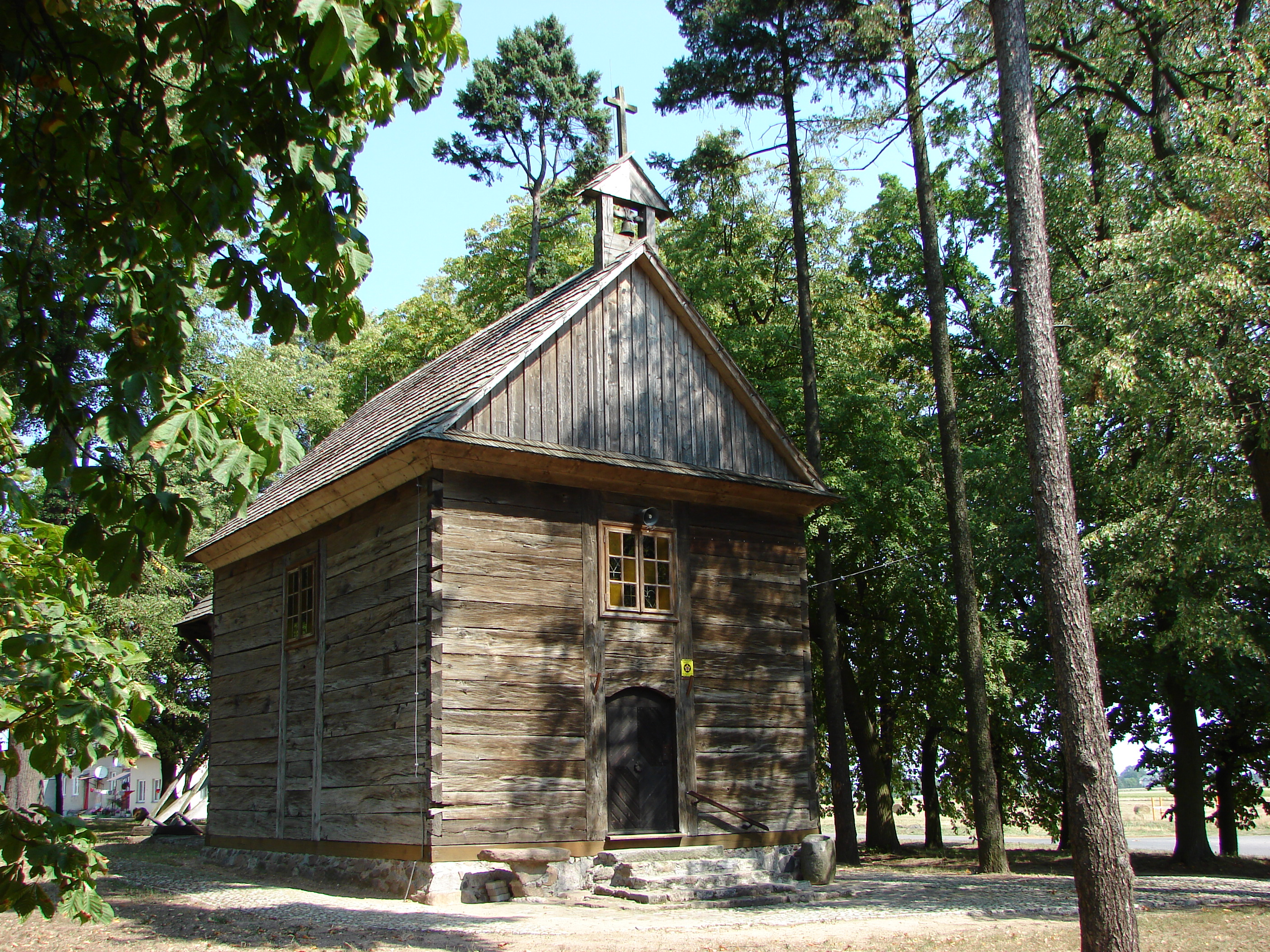
- Wooden chapel of St Mary from about 1840.

- Location within Poland
- Coordinates: 52°09′22″N 19°09′29″E
- Country: Poland
- Voivodeship: Łódź
- County: Łęczyca
- Gmina: Daszyna

Stary Sławoszew [ˈstarɨ swaˈvɔʂɛf] is a village in the administrative district of Gmina Daszyna, within Łęczyca County, Łódź Voivodeship, in central Poland.
