= Marynin, Łódź Voivodeship =

Marynin
- Village
- Location within Poland
- Coordinates: 52°13′40″N 19°10′27″E
- Country: Poland
- Voivodeship: Łódź
- County: Kutno
- Gmina: Krośniewice

Marynin [maˈrɨnin] is a village in the administrative district of Gmina Krośniewice, within Kutno County, Łódź Voivodeship, in central Poland.
