= Zalesie, Kutno County =

Zalesie
- Village
- Location within Poland
- Coordinates: 52°13′29″N 19°10′12″E
- Country: Poland
- Voivodeship: Łódź
- County: Kutno
- Gmina: Krośniewice

Zalesie [zaˈlɛɕɛ] is a village in the administrative district of Gmina Krośniewice, within Kutno County, Łódź Voivodeship, in central Poland.
