= Iwiczna =

- Village
- Location within Poland
- Coordinates: 52°15′00″N 19°12′46″E
- Country: Poland
- Voivodeship: Łódź
- County: Kutno
- Gmina: Krośniewice

Iwiczna [iˈvit͡ʂna] is a village in the administrative district of Gmina Krośniewice, within Kutno County, Łódź Voivodeship, in central Poland.
