= Karkoszki, Łęczyca County =

Village in Gmina Daszyna, Poland

Karkoszki
- Village
- Location within Poland
- Coordinates: 52°08′33″N 19°12′53″E
- Country: Poland
- Voivodeship: Łódź
- County: Łęczyca
- Gmina: Daszyna

Karkoszki [karˈkɔʂki] is a village in the administrative district of Gmina Daszyna, within Łęczyca County, Łódź Voivodeship, in central Poland.
