= Rzędków, Łęczyca County =

Rzędków
- Village
- Location within Poland
- Coordinates: 52°11′58″N 19°09′27″E
- Country: Poland
- Voivodeship: Łódź
- County: Łęczyca
- Gmina: Daszyna

Rzędków [ˈʐɛntkuf] is a village in the administrative district of Gmina Daszyna, within Łęczyca County, Łódź Voivodeship, in central Poland.
