= Pomarzany, Gmina Krośniewice =

Pomarzany
- Village
- Location within Poland
- Coordinates: 52°15′19″N 19°12′38″E
- Country: Poland
- Voivodeship: Łódź
- County: Kutno
- Gmina: Krośniewice

Pomarzany [pɔmaˈʐanɨ] is a village in the administrative district of Gmina Krośniewice, within Kutno County, Łódź Voivodeship, in central Poland.
