= Kosów Lacki =

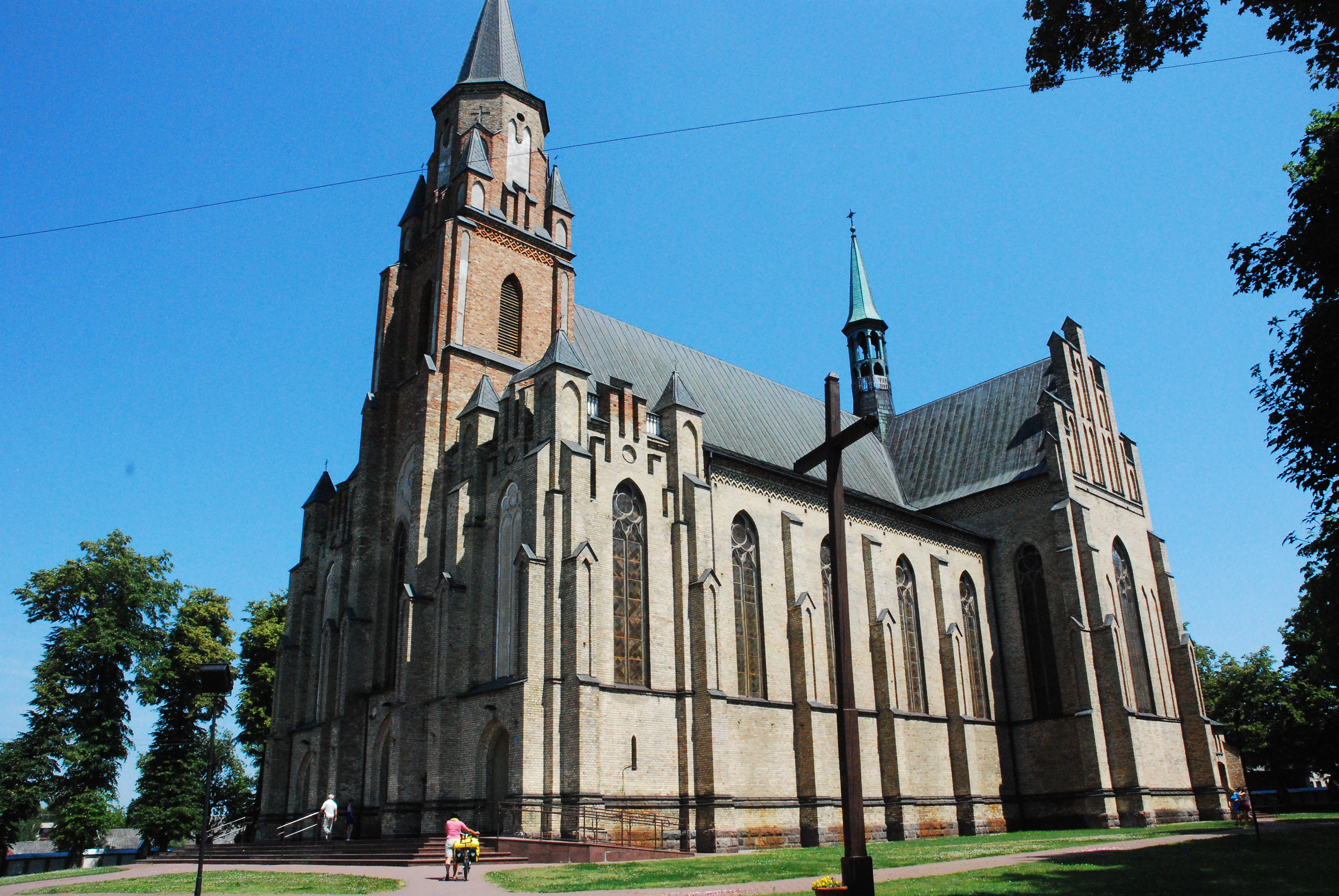
- Church of the Nativity of the Virgin Mary

- Coat of arms

- Location within Poland
- Coordinates: 52°36′N 22°9′E
- Country: Poland
- Voivodeship: Masovian
- County: Sokołów
- Gmina: Kosów Lacki
- Established: 13th century
- Town rights: 1723–1869, 2000

Government
  - Mayor: Jan Słomiak

Area
  - Total: 11.57 km^{2} (4.47 sq mi)

Population (2006)
  - Total: 2,135
  - Density: 184.5/km^{2} (477.9/sq mi)
- Time zone: UTC+1 (CET)
  - Summer (DST): UTC+2 (CEST)
- Postal code: 08-330
- Area code: +48 25
- Car plates: WSK
- Website: http://www.kosowlacki.pl

Kosów Lacki [ˈkɔsuf ˈlat͡skʲi] is a town in Sokołów County, Masovian Voivodeship, Poland, with 2,152 inhabitants (2004).

== History ==
The village of Kossów was mentioned in a document of Duke Konrad I of Masovia from 1202. It was a private village of Polish nobility and later private town, administratively located in the Drohiczyn County in the Podlaskie Voivodeship in the Lesser Poland Province of the Kingdom of Poland. In 1723, a permit was granted to organize a market twice a week and a fair four times in a year. Kosów was granted town rights. In the 18th century, there were two schools in Kosów, in which 40 percent of the students were girls. In 1869, town rights were revoked, because Kosów participated in the January Uprising.

In 1964, a painting by El Greco titled "Ecstasy of St. Francis of Assisi" was found in the presbytery in Kosów Lacki.

Town rights were restored on 1 January 2000.
