= Witów, Kutno County =

Witów
- Village
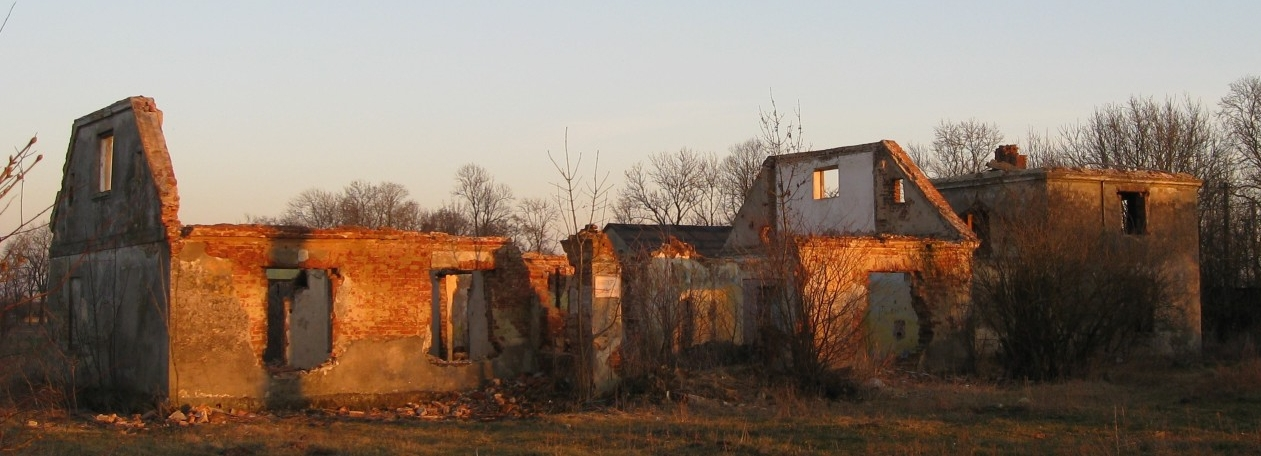

- Location within Poland
- Coordinates: 52°13′52″N 19°14′37″E
- Country: Poland
- Voivodeship: Łódź
- County: Kutno
- Gmina: Krośniewice

Witów [ˈvituf] is a village in the administrative district of Gmina Krośniewice, within Kutno County, Łódź Voivodeship, in central Poland.
