= Jarochówek =

- Village
- Location within Poland
- Coordinates: 52°10′N 19°9′E
- Country: Poland
- Voivodeship: Łódź
- County: Łęczyca
- Gmina: Daszyna
- Population (approx.): 100

Jarochówek [jarɔˈxuvɛk] is a village in the administrative district of Gmina Daszyna, within Łęczyca County, Łódź Voivodeship, in central Poland.

The village has an approximate population of 100.
