= Jabłonna, Łęczyca County =

Jabłonna
- Village
- Location within Poland
- Coordinates: 52°08′30″N 19°11′52″E
- Country: Poland
- Voivodeship: Łódź
- County: Łęczyca
- Gmina: Daszyna

Jabłonna [jaˈbwɔnna] is a village in the administrative district of Gmina Daszyna, within Łęczyca County, Łódź Voivodeship, in central Poland.
