= Szubsk-Towarzystwo =

- Village
- Location within Poland
- Coordinates: 52°13′1″N 19°13′28″E
- Country: Poland
- Voivodeship: Łódź
- County: Kutno
- Gmina: Krośniewice

Szubsk-Towarzystwo [ˈʂupsk tɔvaˈʐɨstfɔ] is a village in the administrative district of Gmina Krośniewice, within Kutno County, Łódź Voivodeship, in central Poland.
