= Gmina Daszyna =

Gmina Daszyna Daszyna Commune
- Gmina
- Coat of arms
- Interactive map of Gmina Daszyna
- Coordinates (Daszyna): 52°10′N 19°11′E
- Country: Poland
- Voivodeship: Łódź
- County: Łęczyca
- Seat: Daszyna

Area
  - Total: 81.03 km^{2} (31.29 sq mi)

Population (2006)
  - Total: 4,207
  - Density: 51.92/km^{2} (134.5/sq mi)
- Time zone: UTC+1 (CET)
  - Summer (DST): UTC+2 (CEST)
- Website: www.daszyna.bip.cc

Gmina Daszyna is a rural gmina (administrative district) in Łęczyca County, Łódź Voivodeship, in central Poland. Its seat is the village of Daszyna, which lies approximately 13 kilometres (8 mi) north of Łęczyca and 47 km (29 mi) north-west of the regional capital Łódź.

The gmina covers an area of 81.03 square kilometres (31.3 sq mi), and as of 2006 its total population was 4,207.

== Villages ==
Gmina Daszyna contains the villages and settlements of:

- Daszyna
- Drzykozy
- Gąsiorów
- Goszczynno
- Jabłonna
- Jacków
- Janice
- Jarochów
- Jarochówek
- Karkoszki
- Koryta
- Krężelewice
- Lipówka
- Łubno
- Mazew
- Mazew-Kolonia
- Miroszewice
- Nowa Żelazna
- Nowy Sławoszew
- Ogrodzona
- Opiesin
- Osędowice
- Rzędków
- Siedlew
- Skrzynki
- Stara Żelazna
- Stary Sławoszew
- Upale
- Walew
- Żabokrzeki
- Zagróbki
- Zieleniew

== Neighbouring gminas ==
Gmina Daszyna is bordered by the gminas of Chodów, Grabów, Krośniewice, Kutno, Łęczyca and Witonia.
