= Franki, Łódź Voivodeship =

Franki
- Village
- Location within Poland
- Coordinates: 52°13′47″N 19°6′21″E
- Country: Poland
- Voivodeship: Łódź
- County: Kutno
- Gmina: Krośniewice
- Population: 70

Franki [ˈfranki] is a village in the administrative district of Gmina Krośniewice, within Kutno County, Łódź Voivodeship, in central Poland.
