= Wola Nowska =

- Village
- Location within Poland
- Coordinates: 52°14′N 19°12′E
- Country: Poland
- Voivodeship: Łódź
- County: Kutno
- Gmina: Krośniewice

Wola Nowska [ˈvɔla ˈnɔfska] is a village in the administrative district of Gmina Krośniewice, within Kutno County, Łódź Voivodeship, in central Poland.
