= Zagróbki =

- Village
- Location within Poland
- Coordinates: 52°9′45″N 19°6′11″E
- Country: Poland
- Voivodeship: Łódź
- County: Łęczyca
- Gmina: Daszyna

Zagróbki [zaˈɡrupki] is a village in the administrative district of Gmina Daszyna, within Łęczyca County, Łódź Voivodeship, in central Poland.
