= Miłosna, Łódź Voivodeship =

Miłosna
- Village
- Location within Poland
- Coordinates: 52°12′58″N 19°10′29″E
- Country: Poland
- Voivodeship: Łódź
- County: Kutno
- Gmina: Krośniewice

Miłosna [miˈwɔsna] is a village in the administrative district of Gmina Krośniewice, within Kutno County, Łódź Voivodeship, in central Poland.
