= Szubsk Duży =

- Village
- Location within Poland
- Coordinates: 52°14′N 19°15′E
- Country: Poland
- Voivodeship: Łódź
- County: Kutno
- Gmina: Krośniewice

Szubsk Duży [ˈʂupsk ˈduʐɨ] is a village in the administrative district of Gmina Krośniewice, within Kutno County, Łódź Voivodeship, in central Poland.
