= Raszynek =

- Village
- Location within Poland
- Coordinates: 52°14′15″N 19°8′8″E
- Country: Poland
- Voivodeship: Łódź
- County: Kutno
- Gmina: Krośniewice
- Postal code: 99-340

Raszynek [raˈʂɨnɛk] is a village in the administrative district of Gmina Krośniewice, within Kutno County, Łódź Voivodeship, in central Poland.
