= Żabokrzeki, Gmina Daszyna =

Żabokrzeki
- Village
- Location within Poland
- Coordinates: 52°09′07″N 19°05′16″E
- Country: Poland
- Voivodeship: Łódź
- County: Łęczyca
- Gmina: Daszyna

Żabokrzeki [ʐabɔˈkʂɛki] is a village in the administrative district of Gmina Daszyna, within Łęczyca County, Łódź Voivodeship, in central Poland.
