= Jankowice, Kutno County =

Jankowice
- Village
- Location within Poland
- Coordinates: 52°13′7″N 19°7′52″E
- Country: Poland
- Voivodeship: Łódź
- County: Kutno
- Gmina: Krośniewice

Jankowice [jankɔˈvit͡sɛ] is a village in the administrative district of Gmina Krośniewice, within Kutno County, Łódź Voivodeship, in central Poland.
