= Nowy Sławoszew =

- Village
- Location within Poland
- Coordinates: 52°08′37″N 19°09′42″E
- Country: Poland
- Voivodeship: Łódź
- County: Łęczyca
- Gmina: Daszyna

Nowy Sławoszew [ˈnɔvɨ swaˈvɔʂɛf] is a village in the administrative district of Gmina Daszyna, within Łęczyca County, Łódź Voivodeship, in central Poland.
