= Gmina Krośniewice =

Gmina Krośniewice Krośniewice Commune
- Gmina
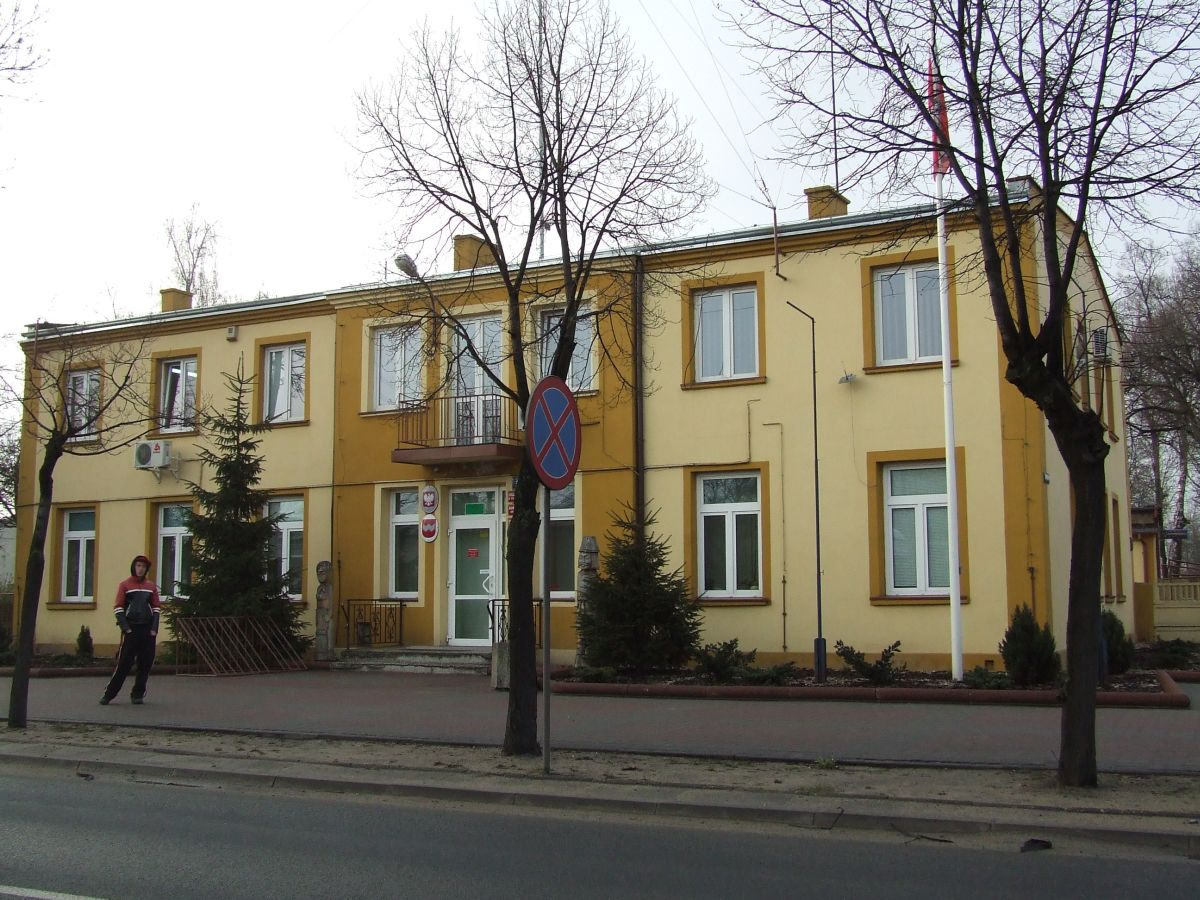

- Coat of arms

- Location within Poland
- Coordinates (Krośniewice): 52°15′13″N 19°10′12″E
- Country: Poland
- Voivodeship: Łódź
- County: Kutno
- Seat: Krośniewice

Area
  - Total: 94.71 km^{2} (36.57 sq mi)
- Elevation: 125 m (410 ft)

Population (2007)
  - Total: 8,983
  - Density: 94.85/km^{2} (245.7/sq mi)
  - Urban: 4,647
  - Rural: 4,390
- Time zone: UTC+1 (CET)
  - Summer (DST): UTC+2 (CEST)
- Postal code: 99-340
- Area code: (+48) 24
- Vehicle registration: EKU
- Website: krosniewice.pl

Gmina Krośniewice is an urban-rural gmina (administrative district) in Kutno County, Łódź Voivodeship, in central Poland. Its seat is the town of Krośniewice, which lies approximately 14 kilometres (9 mi) west of Kutno and 56 km (35 mi) north of the regional capital Łódź.

The gmina covers an area of 94.65 square kilometres (36.5 sq mi), and as of 2006 its total population was 9,037 (out of which the population of Krośniewice amounts to 4,647, and the population of the rural part of the gmina was 4,390).

== Villages ==
Apart from the town of Krośniewice, Gmina Krośniewice contains the villages and settlements of:

- Bardzinek
- Bielice
- Cudniki
- Cygany
- Franki
- Głaznów
- Głogowa
- Godzięby
- Górki Miłońskie
- Iwiczna
- Jankowice
- Kajew
- Kopy
- Kopyta
- Krzewie
- Luboradz
- Marynin
- Miłonice
- Miłosna
- Morawce
- Nowe
- Nowe Jankowice
- Ostałów,
- Pawlikowice
- Pniewko
- Pomarzany
- Raszynek
- Rozpacz
- Skłóty
- Stara Wieś
- Stare Morawce
- Suchodoły
- Szubina
- Szubsk Duży
- Szubsk-Towarzystwo
- Teresin
- Tumidaj
- Witów
- Wola Nowska
- Wychny
- Wymysłów
- Zalesie
- Zieleniew
- Zosin

== Neighbouring gminas ==
Gmina Krośniewice is bordered by the gminas of Chodów, Dąbrowice, Daszyna, Kutno and Nowe Ostrowy.
