= Opiesin, Łęczyca County =

Village in Gmina Daszyna, Poland

Opiesin
- Village
- Location within Poland
- Coordinates: 52°10′38″N 19°04′46″E
- Country: Poland
- Voivodeship: Łódź
- County: Łęczyca
- Gmina: Daszyna

Opiesin [ɔˈpjɛɕin] is a village in the administrative district of Gmina Daszyna, within Łęczyca County, Łódź Voivodeship, in central Poland.
