= Radłów, Greater Poland Voivodeship =

Radłów
- Village
- Location within Poland
- Coordinates: 51°40′N 17°46′E
- Country: Poland
- Voivodeship: Greater Poland
- County: Ostrów
- Gmina: Raszków

Radłów [ˈradwuf] is a village in the administrative district of Gmina Raszków, within Ostrów County, Greater Poland Voivodeship, in west-central Poland.
