= Krzewie, Łódź Voivodeship =

Krzewie
- Village
- Location within Poland
- Coordinates: 52°14′15″N 19°10′44″E
- Country: Poland
- Voivodeship: Łódź
- County: Kutno
- Gmina: Krośniewice
- Population: 80

Krzewie [ˈkʂɛvjɛ] is a village in the administrative district of Gmina Krośniewice, within Kutno County, Łódź Voivodeship, in central Poland.
