= Bielice, Kutno County =

Bielice
- Village
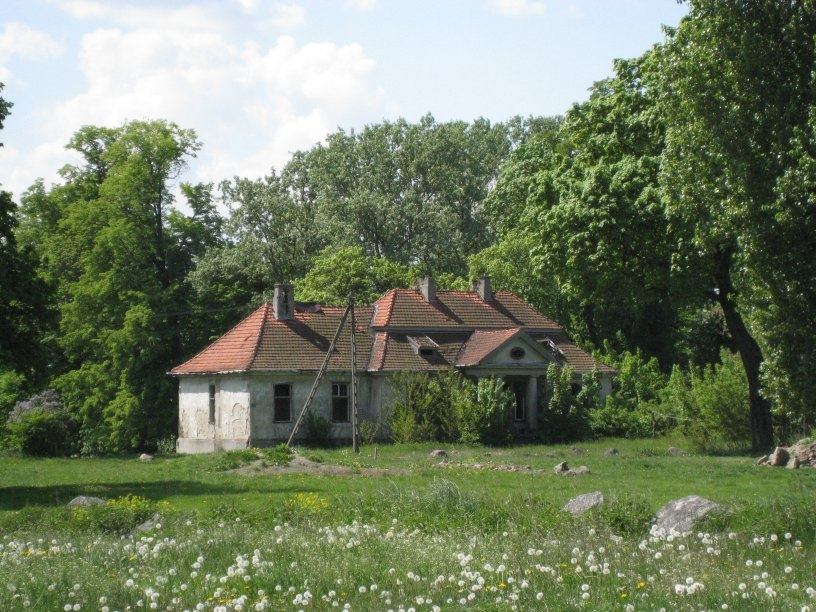
- Manor

- Location within Poland
- Coordinates: 52°14′17″N 19°7′4″E
- Country: Poland
- Voivodeship: Łódź
- County: Kutno
- Gmina: Krośniewice

Bielice [bjɛˈlit͡sɛ] is a village in the administrative district of Gmina Krośniewice, within Kutno County, Łódź Voivodeship, in central Poland.
