= Nowe Jankowice, Łódź Voivodeship =

Nowe Jankowice
- Village
- Location within Poland
- Coordinates: 52°12′12″N 19°05′15″E
- Country: Poland
- Voivodeship: Łódź
- County: Kutno
- Gmina: Krośniewice

Nowe Jankowice [ˈnɔvɛ jaŋkɔˈvit͡sɛ] is a village in the administrative district of Gmina Krośniewice, within Kutno County, Łódź Voivodeship, in central Poland.
