= Głaznów =

- Village
- Location within Poland
- Coordinates: 52°14′48″N 19°7′51″E
- Country: Poland
- Voivodeship: Łódź
- County: Kutno
- Gmina: Krośniewice
- Population: 140

Głaznów [ˈɡwaznuf] is a village in the administrative district of Gmina Krośniewice, within Kutno County, Łódź Voivodeship, in central Poland.
