= Wychny =

- Village
- Location within Poland
- Coordinates: 52°13′N 19°6′E
- Country: Poland
- Voivodeship: Łódź
- County: Kutno
- Gmina: Krośniewice

Wychny [ˈvɨxnɨ] is a village in the administrative district of Gmina Krośniewice, within Kutno County, Łódź Voivodeship, in central Poland.
