= Stara Wieś, Gmina Krośniewice =

Stara Wieś
- Village
- Location within Poland
- Coordinates: 52°13′47″N 19°07′25″E
- Country: Poland
- Voivodeship: Łódź
- County: Kutno
- Gmina: Krośniewice

Stara Wieś [ˈstara ˈvjɛɕ] is a village in the administrative district of Gmina Krośniewice, within Kutno County, Łódź Voivodeship, in central Poland.
