= Miłonice Manor House =

The dwór (manor house) in Miłonice, Poland, was built around 1750-1760. It belonged to Stanisław Szypowski, who owned 239 hectares of land. After World War II the former seat of landowners was settled by "squatters". Today it is owned by municipal office in Krośniewice.

== Building ==
Building was renovated several times and still has the characteristics of the late Baroque. It is a ground-floor building with a basement and attic. The wooden and timbered building has log structure and stands on foundation made of stones and bricks. The Mansion was built on a rectangular plan, with forward vestibule topped with a triangular gable in the front elevation and a newer brick outhouse from the west. There are biaxial garrets topped with slender, triangular gables both in the front and in the back side of the building. It has a two-bay interior layout with a vestibule and a cabinet on the axis. There is also a large room that served as a dining room in the past, which is adjacent to the west side of vestibule. Rooms located on the edges of the rectangle are three-bay. Hipped roof, formerly shingled, now is sheet-covered.

== Interesting facts ==
Mansion in Miłonice is located in the remains of the landscape park and - for sure – is one of the most beautiful late Baroque wooden seats in Poland.
