= Szczurawice =

- Village
- Location within Poland
- Coordinates: 51°43′N 17°48′E
- Country: Poland
- Voivodeship: Greater Poland
- County: Ostrów
- Gmina: Raszków

Szczurawice [ʂt͡ʂuraˈvit͡sɛ] is a village in the administrative district of Gmina Raszków, within Ostrów County, Greater Poland Voivodeship, in west-central Poland.
