= Lubno =

Lubno may refer to:

- Lubno, West Pomeranian Voivodeship (north-west Poland)
- Lubno, Lubusz Voivodeship (west Poland)
- Lubno (Frýdlant nad Ostravicí) (part of Frýdlant nad Ostravicí, east Czech Republic)

== See also ==
- Łubno (disambiguation)
