= Bardzinek =

- Village
- Location within Poland
- Coordinates: 52°15′20″N 19°8′21″E
- Country: Poland
- Voivodeship: Łódź
- County: Kutno
- Gmina: Krośniewice

Bardzinek [barˈd͡ʑinɛk] is a village in the administrative district of Gmina Krośniewice, within Kutno County, Łódź Voivodeship, in central Poland. A nest village of the Bardziński noble family.
