= Walew =

- Village
- Location within Poland
- Coordinates: 52°10′N 19°11′E
- Country: Poland
- Voivodeship: Łódź
- County: Łęczyca
- Gmina: Daszyna

Walew [ˈvalɛf] is a village in the administrative district of Gmina Daszyna, within Łęczyca County, Łódź Voivodeship, in central Poland.
