= Bugaj, Gmina Raszków =

Bugaj
- Village
- Location within Poland
- Coordinates: 51°47′54″N 17°40′1″E
- Country: Poland
- Voivodeship: Greater Poland
- County: Ostrów
- Gmina: Raszków

Bugaj [ˈbuɡai̯] is a village in the administrative district of Gmina Raszków, within Ostrów County, Greater Poland Voivodeship, in west-central Poland.
