= Gmina Raszków =

Gmina Raszków Raszków Commune
- Gmina
- Coat of arms
- Interactive map of Gmina Raszków
- Coordinates (Raszków): 51°43′N 17°44′E
- Country: Poland
- Voivodeship: Greater Poland
- County: Ostrów
- Seat: Raszków

Area
  - Total: 134.46 km^{2} (51.92 sq mi)

Population (2006)
  - Total: 11,275
  - Density: 83.854/km^{2} (217.18/sq mi)
  - Urban: 2,037
  - Rural: 9,238
- Website: https://www.raszkow.pl/

Gmina Raszków is an urban-rural gmina (administrative district) in Ostrów County, Greater Poland Voivodeship, in west-central Poland. Its seat is the town of Raszków, which lies approximately 8 kilometres (5 mi) north of Ostrów Wielkopolski and 95 km (59 mi) south-east of the regional capital Poznań.

The gmina covers an area of 134.46 square kilometres (51.9 sq mi), and as of 2006 its total population is 11,275 (out of which the population of Raszków amounts to 2,037, and the population of the rural part of the gmina is 9,238).

== Villages ==
Apart from the town of Raszków, Gmina Raszków contains the villages and settlements of Bieganin, Bugaj, Drogosław, Głogowa, Grudzielec, Grudzielec Nowy, Janków Zaleśny, Jaskółki, Jelitów, Józefów, Koryta, Korytnica, Ligota, Moszczanka, Niemojewiec, Pogrzybów, Przybysławice, Rąbczyn, Radłów, Skrzebowa, Sulisław, Szczurawice and Walentynów.

== Neighbouring gminas ==
Gmina Raszków is bordered by the town of Ostrów Wielkopolski and by the gminas of Dobrzyca, Krotoszyn, Ostrów Wielkopolski and Pleszew.
