= Siedlew =

- Village
- Location within Poland
- Coordinates: 52°08′27″N 19°07′33″E
- Country: Poland
- Voivodeship: Łódź
- County: Łęczyca
- Gmina: Daszyna

Siedlew [ˈɕɛdlɛf] is a village in the administrative district of Gmina Daszyna, within Łęczyca County, Łódź Voivodeship, in central Poland.
