= Morawce =

- Village
- Location within Poland
- Coordinates: 52°15′N 19°10′E
- Country: Poland
- Voivodeship: Łódź
- County: Kutno
- Gmina: Krośniewice

Morawce [mɔˈraft͡sɛ] is a village in the administrative district of Gmina Krośniewice, within Kutno County, Łódź Voivodeship, in central Poland.
