= Janków Zaleśny =

- Village
- Location within Poland
- Coordinates: 51°42′N 17°39′E
- Country: Poland
- Voivodeship: Greater Poland
- County: Ostrów
- Gmina: Raszków
- Population: 540

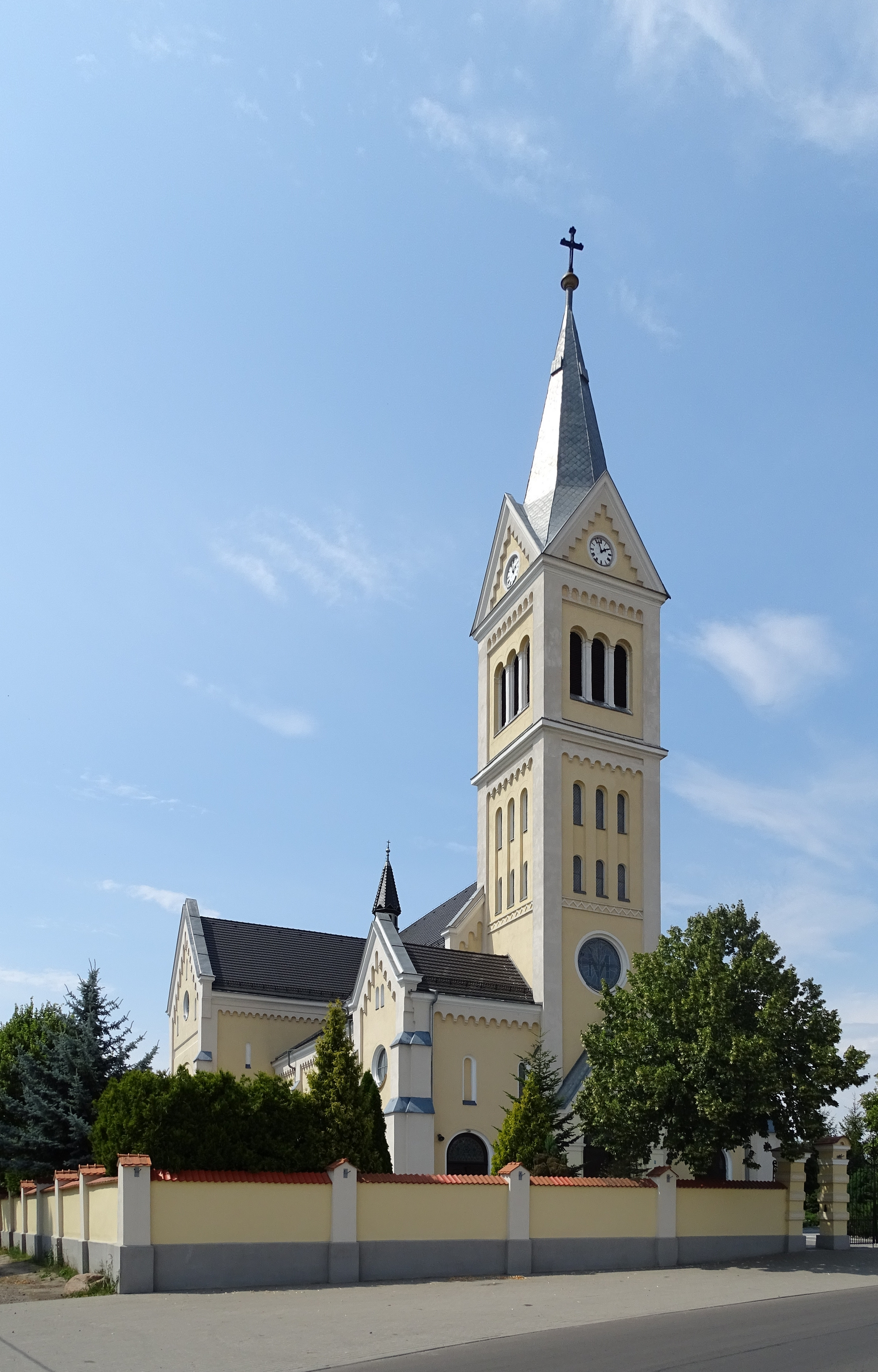
Parish church of St. Adalbert.

Janków Zaleśny [ˈjankuf zaˈlɛɕnɨ] is a village in the administrative district of Gmina Raszków, within Ostrów County, Greater Poland Voivodeship, in west-central Poland.
