= Rozpacz =

- Village
- Location within Poland
- Coordinates: 52°14′11″N 19°9′24″E
- Country: Poland
- Voivodeship: Łódź
- County: Kutno
- Gmina: Krośniewice

Rozpacz [ˈrɔspat͡ʂ] is a village in the administrative district of Gmina Krośniewice, within Kutno County, Łódź Voivodeship, in central Poland.
