= Teresin, Kutno County =

Teresin
- Village
- Location within Poland
- Coordinates: 52°15′46″N 19°7′12″E
- Country: Poland
- Voivodeship: Łódź
- County: Kutno
- Gmina: Krośniewice

Teresin (Polish pronunciation: [tɛˈrɛɕin]) is a village in the administrative district of Gmina Krośniewice, within Kutno County, Łódź Voivodeship, in central Poland.
