= Ogrodzona, Łęczyca County =

Ogrodzona
- Village
- Location within Poland
- Coordinates: 52°11′58″N 19°10′28″E
- Country: Poland
- Voivodeship: Łódź
- County: Łęczyca
- Gmina: Daszyna
- Population: 90

Ogrodzona [ɔɡrɔˈd͡zɔna] is a village in the administrative district of Gmina Daszyna, within Łęczyca County, Łódź Voivodeship, in central Poland.
