= Lipówka, Łódź Voivodeship =

Lipówka
- Village
- Location within Poland
- Coordinates: 52°10′49″N 19°08′57″E
- Country: Poland
- Voivodeship: Łódź
- County: Łęczyca
- Gmina: Daszyna

Lipówka [liˈpufka] is a village in the administrative district of Gmina Daszyna, within Łęczyca County, Łódź Voivodeship, in central Poland.
