= Jacków, Łęczyca County =

Jacków
- Village
- Location within Poland
- Coordinates: 52°07′44″N 19°06′21″E
- Country: Poland
- Voivodeship: Łódź
- County: Łęczyca
- Gmina: Daszyna

Jacków [ˈjat͡skuf] is a village in the administrative district of Gmina Daszyna, within Łęczyca County, Łódź Voivodeship, in central Poland.
