= KOPY-FM =

- Alice, Texas; United States
- Broadcast area: Kingsville-Alice-Falfurrias
- Frequency: 92.1 MHz

Programming
- Language: Spanish
- Format: Tejano

Ownership
- Owner: Claro Communications, Ltd
- Sister stations: KOPY

History
- First air date: April 12, 1976 (first license granted)
- Former call signs: KDSI (1982–1985); KQNN (1991–1996); KOPY (1996–1985)

Technical information
- Licensing authority: FCC
- Facility ID: 982
- Class: A
- ERP: 6,000 watts
- HAAT: 94.0 meters (308.4 ft)
- Transmitter coordinates: 27°46′39.00″N 98°4′52.00″W

Links
- Public license information: Public file; LMS
- Website: thetejanooriginal.com

KOPY-FM (92.1 FM) is a radio station licensed to Alice, Texas, United States, the station serves the Kingsville-Alice-Falfurrias area. The station is currently owned by Claro Communications, Ltd.

== History ==
The station was assigned the call letters KDSI on January 13, 1982. On June 3, 1985, the station changed its call sign to the current KOPY-FM. On August 5, 1991 to KQNN, on April 1, 1996 to KOPY, on August 23, 1996 to the current KOPY-FM,
