= Luboradz, Łódź Voivodeship =

Luboradz
- Village
- Location within Poland
- Coordinates: 52°13′17″N 19°13′3″E
- Country: Poland
- Voivodeship: Łódź
- County: Kutno
- Gmina: Krośniewice

Luboradz [luˈbɔrat͡s] is a village in the administrative district of Gmina Krośniewice, within Kutno County, Łódź Voivodeship, in central Poland.
