= Głogowa, Łódź Voivodeship =

Głogowa
- Village
- Location within Poland
- Coordinates: 52°12′20″N 19°7′25″E
- Country: Poland
- Voivodeship: Łódź
- County: Kutno
- Gmina: Krośniewice

Głogowa [ɡwɔˈɡɔva] is a village in the administrative district of Gmina Krośniewice, within Kutno County, Łódź Voivodeship, in central Poland.
