= Łubno, Łódź Voivodeship =

Łubno
- Village
- Location within Poland
- Coordinates: 52°11′N 19°5′E
- Country: Poland
- Voivodeship: Łódź
- County: Łęczyca
- Gmina: Daszyna

Łubno [ˈwubnɔ] is a village in the administrative district of Gmina Daszyna, within Łęczyca County, Łódź Voivodeship, in central Poland.
