= Koryta (Plzeň-North District) =

- Municipality
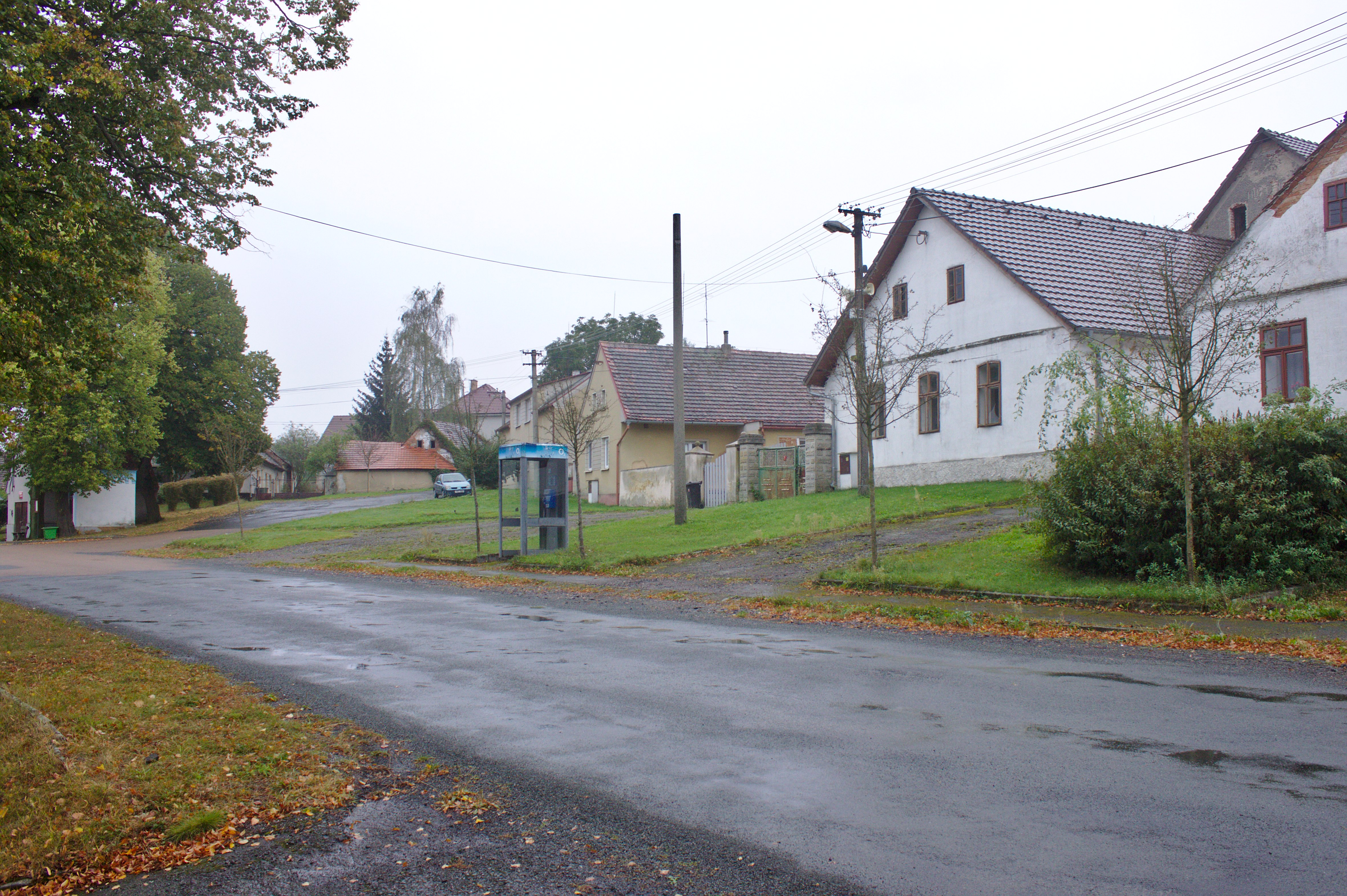
- Centre of Koryta

- Location in the Czech Republic
- Coordinates: 49°54′2″N 13°28′29″E
- Country: Czech Republic
- Region: Plzeň
- District: Plzeň-North
- First mentioned: 1175

Area
  - Total: 6.21 km^{2} (2.40 sq mi)
- Elevation: 400 m (1,300 ft)

Population (2026-01-01)
  - Total: 121
  - Density: 19.5/km^{2} (50.5/sq mi)
- Time zone: UTC+1 (CET)
  - Summer (DST): UTC+2 (CEST)
- Postal code: 331 51
- Website: www.obec-koryta.cz

Koryta is a municipality and village in Plzeň-North District in the Plzeň Region of the Czech Republic. It has about 100 inhabitants.

Koryta lies approximately 19 kilometres (12 mi) north-east of Plzeň and 71 km (44 mi) west of Prague.

== History ==
The first written mention of Koryta is from 1175, when Duke Soběslav II donated the village to the monastery in Plasy. In 1418, the monastery sold the village to Jiřík of Čivice. From 1435 to 1510, Koryta was owned by the Kolowrat family and belonged to their Libštejn estate. After the village changed hands several times, it was annexed to the Plasy estate in 1623.

== Demographics ==
Historical population
Year	Pop.	±%
1869	211	—
1880	229	+8.5%
1890	214	−6.6%
1900	229	+7.0%
1910	275	+20.1%
1921	263	−4.4%
1930	220	−16.3%
1950	165	−25.0%
1961	161	−2.4%
1970	141	−12.4%
1980	148	+5.0%
1991	118	−20.3%
2001	105	−11.0%
2011	117	+11.4%
2021	107	−8.5%
Source: Censuses
