= Pawlikowice, Kutno County =

Pawlikowice
- Village
- Location within Poland
- Coordinates: 52°14′32″N 19°12′32″E
- Country: Poland
- Voivodeship: Łódź
- County: Kutno
- Gmina: Krośniewice

Pawlikowice [pavlikɔˈvit͡sɛ] is a village in the administrative district of Gmina Krośniewice, within Kutno County, Łódź Voivodeship, in central Poland.
