= Cygany, Łódź Voivodeship =

Cygany
- Village
- Location within Poland
- Coordinates: 52°12′14″N 19°13′15″E
- Country: Poland
- Voivodeship: Łódź
- County: Kutno
- Gmina: Krośniewice

Cygany [t͡sɨˈɡanɨ] is a village in the administrative district of Gmina Krośniewice, within Kutno County, Łódź Voivodeship, in central Poland.
