= Suchodoły, Łódź Voivodeship =

Suchodoły
- Village
- Location within Poland
- Coordinates: 52°14′6″N 19°5′16″E
- Country: Poland
- Voivodeship: Łódź
- County: Kutno
- Gmina: Krośniewice

Suchodoły [suxɔˈdɔwɨ] is a village in the administrative district of Gmina Krośniewice, within Kutno County, Łódź Voivodeship, in central Poland.
