= KOPY (AM) =

Radio station in Alice, Texas

- Alice, Texas; United States
- Broadcast area: Corpus Christi metropolitan area
- Frequency: 1070 kHz
- Branding: La Poderosa 1070AM - 98.7FM

Programming
- Language: Spanish
- Format: Spanish Christian

Ownership
- Owner: Claro Communications, Ltd
- Sister stations: KOPY-FM

History
- First air date: May 1, 1947 (first license granted)
- Former call signs: KBKI (1947 - 1957); KOPY (1957 - 1985); KDSI (1985 - 1996)

Technical information
- Licensing authority: FCC
- Facility ID: 983
- Class: B
- Power: 1,000 watts
- Translators: 98.7 K254AZ (Alice); 101.7 K269HD (Alice)

Links
- Public license information: Public file; LMS
- Webcast: Listen Live
- Website: www.kopy1070am.com

KOPY is a Spanish Christian radio station broadcasting on 1070 AM. Licensed to Alice, Texas, United States, the station is currently owned by Claro Communications, Ltd.
