= Pogrzybów =

- Village
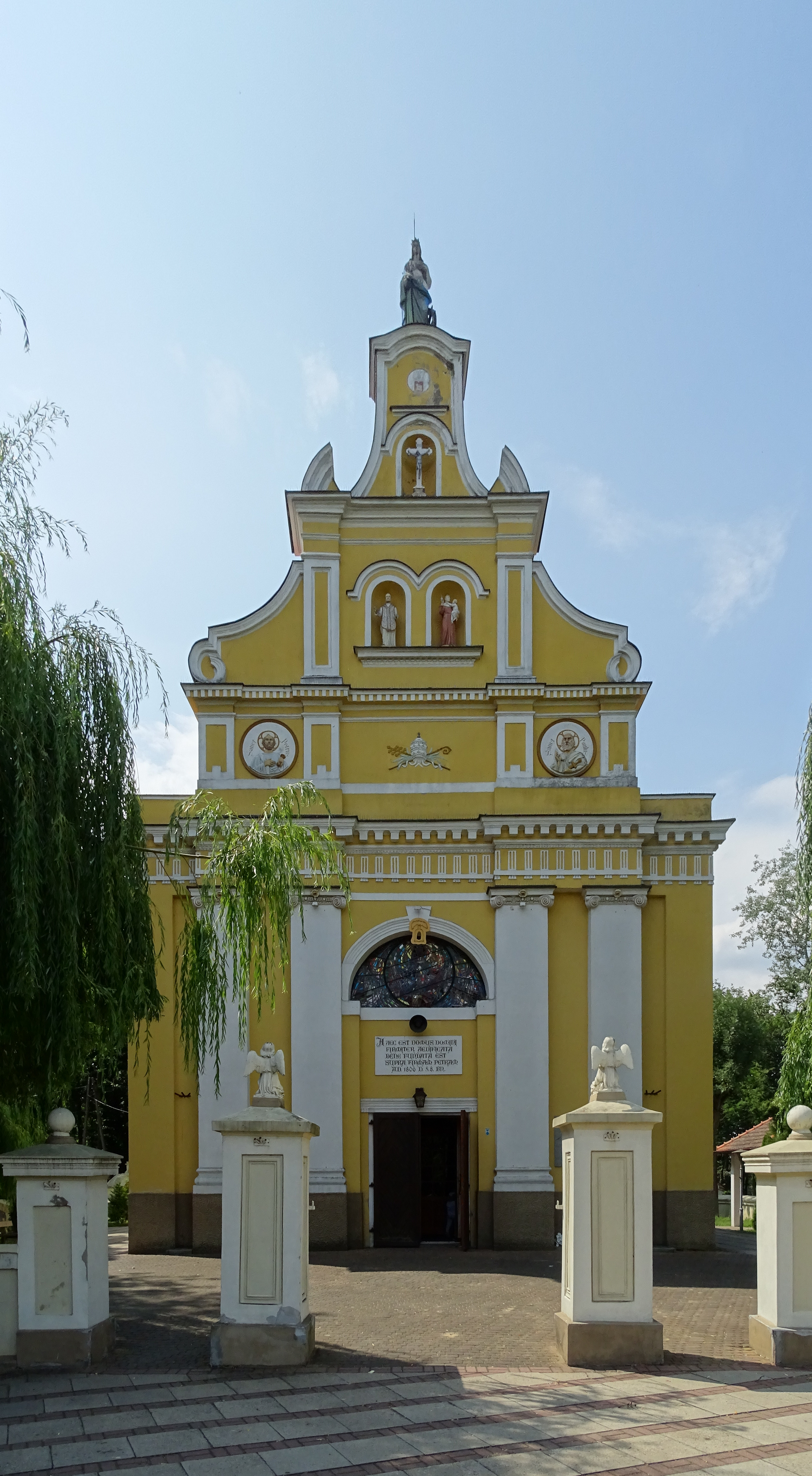
- Saint Catherine church in Pogrzybów

- Location within Poland
- Coordinates: 51°43′N 17°43′E
- Country: Poland
- Voivodeship: Greater Poland
- County: Ostrów
- Gmina: Raszków
- Time zone: UTC+1 (CET)
  - Summer (DST): UTC+2 (CEST)
- Postal code: 63-440
- Vehicle registration: POS

Pogrzybów [pɔˈɡʐɨbuf] is a village in the administrative district of Gmina Raszków in Ostrów County, Greater Poland Voivodeship in west-central Poland.
