= Koryta, Greater Poland Voivodeship =

Koryta
- Village
- Location within Poland
- Coordinates: 51°48′N 17°42′E
- Country: Poland
- Voivodeship: Greater Poland
- County: Ostrów
- Gmina: Raszków
- Population (approx.): 1,000

Koryta [kɔˈrɨta] is a village in the administrative district of Gmina Raszków, within Ostrów County, Greater Poland Voivodeship, in west-central Poland.

The village has an approximate population of 1,000.
