= Skrzynki, Łęczyca County =

Skrzynki
- Village
- Location within Poland
- Coordinates: 52°8′N 19°6′E
- Country: Poland
- Voivodeship: Łódź
- County: Łęczyca
- Gmina: Daszyna
- Population: 70

Skrzynki [ˈskʂɨŋki] is a village in the administrative district of Gmina Daszyna, within Łęczyca County, Łódź Voivodeship, in central Poland.
