= Zieleniew, Łęczyca County =

Zieleniew
- Village
- Location within Poland
- Coordinates: 52°10′5″N 19°6′24″E
- Country: Poland
- Voivodeship: Łódź
- County: Łęczyca
- Gmina: Daszyna
- Population: 120

Zieleniew [ʑɛˈlɛɲɛf] is a village in the administrative district of Gmina Daszyna, within Łęczyca County, Łódź Voivodeship, in central Poland.
