= Ann Nowé =

Belgian computer scientist

Ann Nowé is a Belgian computer scientist whose research topics in artificial intelligence have included reinforcement learning, multi-agent systems, artificial life, and microarray analysis techniques. She is a professor at Vrije Universiteit Brussel, affiliated both with the Computer Science Department in the Faculty of Sciences and the Computer Science group of the Faculty of Engineering. She heads the university's artificial intelligence laboratory.

== Education and career ==
Nowé studied mathematics with a minor in computer science at Ghent University, earning a master's degree in 1987. She completed a Ph.D. in 1994 through Vrije Universiteit Brussel, after two years as a visiting student at Queen Mary and Westfield College in London. Her dissertation, The synthesis of 'safe' fuzzy controllers based on reinforcement learning, was promoted by Viviane Jonckers.

After postdoctoral research at Vrije Universiteit Brussel, she became an assistant professor there in 1999, with a split appointment between the Faculty of Sciences and the Faculty of Engineering. She was promoted to associate professor in 2004 and full professor in 2012.

== Recognition ==
Nowé is a Fellow of the European Association for Artificial Intelligence.
