= Miłonice =

- Village
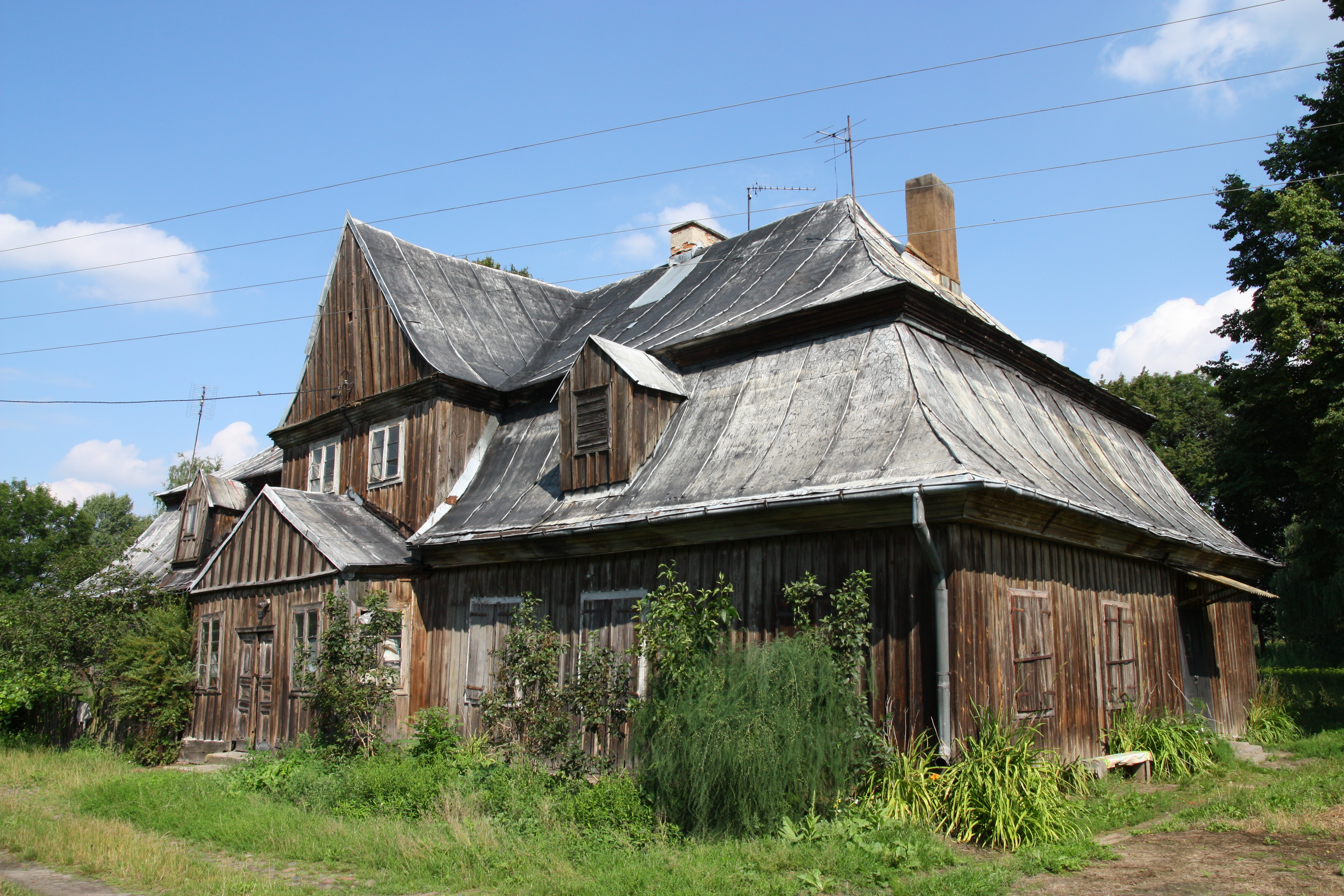
- Manor

- Location within Poland
- Coordinates: 52°13′37″N 19°8′49″E
- Country: Poland
- Voivodeship: Łódź
- County: Kutno
- Gmina: Krośniewice

Miłonice [miwɔˈnit͡sɛ] is a village in the administrative district of Gmina Krośniewice, within Kutno County, Łódź Voivodeship, in central Poland.

== See also ==
- Miłonice Manor House
