= Pniewko, Łódź Voivodeship =

Pniewko
- Village
- Location within Poland
- Coordinates: 52°15′20″N 19°7′6″E
- Country: Poland
- Voivodeship: Łódź
- County: Kutno
- Gmina: Krośniewice

Pniewko [ˈpɲɛfkɔ] is a village in the administrative district of Gmina Krośniewice, within Kutno County, Łódź Voivodeship, in central Poland.
