= Nowe, Łódź Voivodeship =

Nowe
- Village
- Location within Poland
- Coordinates: 52°14′33″N 19°13′46″E
- Country: Poland
- Voivodeship: Łódź
- County: Kutno
- Gmina: Krośniewice

Nowe [ˈnɔvɛ] is a village in the administrative district of Gmina Krośniewice, within Kutno County, Łódź Voivodeship, in central Poland.
