= Gąsiorów, Łódź Voivodeship =

Gąsiorów
- Village
- Location within Poland
- Coordinates: 52°9′N 19°7′E
- Country: Poland
- Voivodeship: Łódź
- County: Łęczyca
- Gmina: Daszyna

Gąsiorów [ɡɔ̃ˈɕɔruf] is a village in the administrative district of Gmina Daszyna, within Łęczyca County, Łódź Voivodeship, in central Poland.
