= Moszczanka, Greater Poland Voivodeship =

Moszczanka
- Village
- Location within Poland
- Coordinates: 51°44′N 17°46′E
- Country: Poland
- Voivodeship: Greater Poland
- County: Ostrów
- Gmina: Raszków

Moszczanka [mɔʂˈt͡ʂanka] is a village in the administrative district of Gmina Raszków, within Ostrów County, Greater Poland Voivodeship, in west-central Poland.
