= Czarnów =

Czarnów may refer to the following places in Poland:

- Czarnów, Lower Silesian Voivodeship (south-west Poland)
- Czarnów, Łódź Voivodeship (central Poland)
- Czarnów, Piaseczno County in Masovian Voivodeship (east-central Poland)
- Czarnów, Warsaw West County in Masovian Voivodeship (east-central Poland)
- Czarnów, Wołomin County in Masovian Voivodeship (east-central Poland)
- Czarnów, Lubusz Voivodeship (west Poland)
- Czarnów, a former village located in the present-day Warsaw, Poland, within the neighbourhood of Siekierki
