= Tomczyce =

Tomczyce may refer to the following places:

- Tomczyce, Łódź Voivodeship (central Poland)
- Tomczyce, Gmina Błędów in Masovian Voivodeship (east-central Poland)
- Tomczyce, Gmina Mogielnica in Masovian Voivodeship (east-central Poland)
- Tomczyce, Greater Poland Voivodeship (west-central Poland)
