= Kujawki =

Kujawki may refer to the following places:

- Kujawki, Greater Poland Voivodeship (west-central Poland)
- Kujawki, Łódź Voivodeship (central Poland)
- Kujawki, Świętokrzyskie Voivodeship (south-central Poland)
