= Florianów =

Florianów may refer to the following places:

- Florianów, Kutno County in Łódź Voivodeship (central Poland)
- Florianów, Zgierz County in Łódź Voivodeship (central Poland)
- Florianów, Masovian Voivodeship (east-central Poland)
- Florianów, Silesian Voivodeship (south Poland)
