= Ernestynów =

Ernestynów may refer to the following places in Poland:

- Ernestynów, Lower Silesian Voivodeship (south-west Poland)
- Ernestynów, Łódź Voivodeship (central Poland)
- Ernestynów, Lublin Voivodeship (east Poland)
