= Jaroszówka =

Jaroszówka may refer to the following places in Poland:

- Jaroszówka, a district of the city of Białystok (NE Poland)
- Jaroszówka, Lower Silesian Voivodeship (south-west Poland)
- Jaroszówka, Łódź Voivodeship (central Poland)
- Jaroszówka, Lesser Poland Voivodeship (south Poland)
