= Pniewo =

Pniewo may refer to:

- Pniewo, Koło County in Greater Poland Voivodeship (west-central Poland)
- Pniewo, Złotów County in Greater Poland Voivodeship (west-central Poland)
- Pniewo, Łódź Voivodeship (central Poland)
- Pniewo, Gmina Międzyrzecz in Lubusz Voivodeship (west Poland)
- Pniewo, Gmina Bledzew in Lubusz Voivodeship (west Poland)
- Pniewo, Gmina Nasielsk, Nowy Dwór County in Masovian Voivodeship (east-central Poland)
- Pniewo, Pułtusk County in Masovian Voivodeship (east-central Poland)
- Pniewo, Podlaskie Voivodeship (north-east Poland)
- Pniewo, Warmian-Masurian Voivodeship (north Poland)
- Pniewo, Gryfice County in West Pomeranian Voivodeship (north-west Poland)
- Pniewo, Gryfino County in West Pomeranian Voivodeship (north-west Poland)
