= Stanisławice =

Stanisławice may refer to the following places:

- Stanisławice, Lesser Poland Voivodeship (south Poland)
- Stanisławice, Kutno County in Łódź Voivodeship (central Poland)
- Stanisławice, Radomsko County in Łódź Voivodeship (central Poland)
- Stanisławice, Masovian Voivodeship (east-central Poland)
- Stanisławice, Silesian Voivodeship (south Poland)
