= Ruszki =

Ruszki may refer to the following places:

- Ruszki, Kuyavian-Pomeranian Voivodeship (north-central Poland)
- Ruszki, Łódź Voivodeship (central Poland)
- Ruszki, Masovian Voivodeship (east-central Poland)
