= Łęczyca Voivodeship =

Former administrative division of the Kingdom of Poland

Coordinates: 52°03′34″N 19°12′04″E

Łęczyca Voivodeship Województwo łęczyckie
- Voivodeship of Polish–Lithuanian Commonwealth^{1}
- 1339 or 1352 (sources vary)–1793
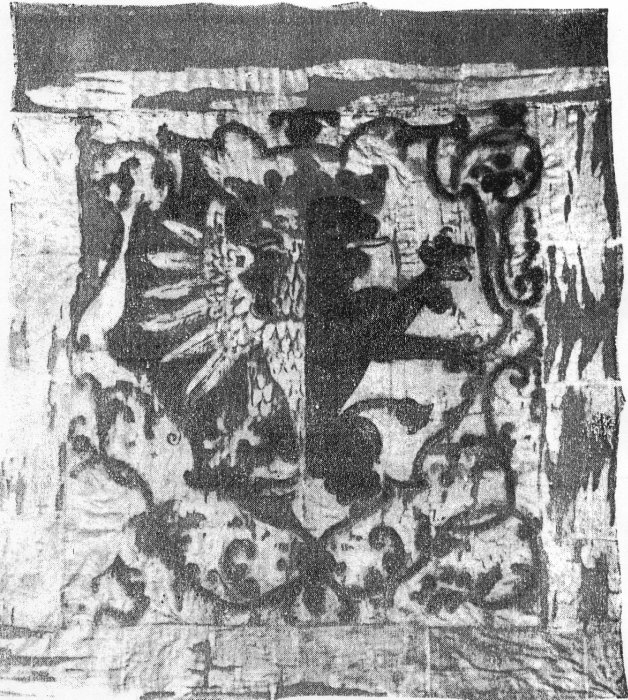
- Heraldic flag Coat of arms

- Łęczyca Voivodeship of the Polish–Lithuanian Commonwealth.
- Capital: Łęczyca
- Area
- 4,080 km^{2} (1,580 sq mi)
- History
  - Established: 1339 or 1352 (sources vary)
  - Second Partition of Poland: 1793
- Political subdivisions: Counties: 3
Preceded by	Succeeded by
Duchy of Łęczyca / Duchy of Łęczyca	West Prussia / West Prussia
- Today part of: Poland
- ¹ Voivodeship of the Polish Crown in the Polish–Lithuanian Commonwealth; Voivodeship of the Kingdom of Poland before 1569.

Łęczyca Voivodeship (Polish: Województwo łęczyckie) was a unit of administrative division and local government in Poland from the 14th century until the partitions of Poland in 1772–1795. It was part of Greater Poland Province, and its capital was in Łęczyca. The voivodeship had the area of 4,080 square kilometers, divided into three counties. Local sejmiks took place at Łęczyca. The city of Łódź, which until the 19th century was a small town, for centuries belonged to Łęczyca Voivodeship.

== History ==
The voivodeship was created by King Ladislaus the Short, out of the territory of Duchy of Łęczyca, which had been established after the 1138 Testament of Bolesław III Wrymouth. It had five senators in the Senate of the Kingdom of Poland (since 1569 the Polish–Lithuanian Commonwealth). These were: Voivode of Łęczyca, Castellan of Łęczyca, Castellan of Brzeziny, Castellan of Inowlodz, and Castellan of Konary. At the sejmiks, local nobility elected four deputies to the Sejm of Poland, and two deputies to the Greater Poland Tribunal at Piotrków Trybunalski.

Zygmunt Gloger in his monumental book Historical Geography of the Lands of Old Poland gives a detailed description of Łęczyca Voivodeship:

"Following the testament of Bolesław Wrymouth, the Land of Łęczyca was a separate duchy, ruled by princes of the Piast dynasty (...) King Ladislaus the Short reunited the duchy with Poland, making it a separate voivodeship. Local residents were used to their own legal system, so King Władysław II Jagiełło (Jogaila) decided to keep a separate official there. In 1418, the szlachta of Łęczyca established its own rules, the 27 Articles of Constitutiones Terrae Lanciciensis generales (...)

The voivodeship had the area of 80 square miles, stretching from Kłodawa in the north, to the Pilica river in the south, where it bordered Sandomierz Voivodeship. In the 16th century, it had 74 Roman-Catholic parishes, 25 towns and 875 villages. It was the second most densely populated voivodeship of the Polish–Lithuanian Commonwealth, behind Brześć Kujawski Voivodeship (...)

Łęczyca Voivodeship had five senators: the Voivode of Łęczyca, the Castellan of Łęczyca, and the Castellans of Brzeziny, Inowłódz, and Konary (...) Of the three counties, the largest one was Łęczyca County, which covered more than half of the area of the voivodeship. Local sejmiks took place at Łęczyca, where four deputies were elected to the Sejm, and additional two to the Greater Poland Tribunal at Piotrków Trybunalski. Main starostas resided at Łęczyca, Inowłódz, Zgierz and Kłodawa".

== Administration ==
Governor seat: Łęczyca

Voivodes:

- Spycigniew of Dąbrowa Zielona
- Jan "Scibor" Taczanowski (c. 1437)
- Stanisław Radziejowski (1627–1637)
- Maksymilian Przerębski (1637-I 1639)
- Stefan Gembicki (I 1639–1653)

Regional council seat (Sejmik): Łęczyca

Political division

- County of Łęczyca, area 2,447 km^{2}.,
- County of Brzeziny, area 1,300 km^{2}.,
- County of Orłów, area 629 km^{2}.

== Cities and towns ==
=== Brzeziny County ===
- Będków
- Bratoszewice
- Brzeziny
- Inowłódz
- Łódź
- Stare Skoszewy
- Stryków
- Ujazd

=== Łęczyca County ===
- Budzynek
- Dąbie
- Dąbrowice
- Grabów
- Grzegorzew
- Kazimierz
- Kłodawa
- Krośniewice
- Łęczyca
- Łąkoszyn
- Parzęczew
- Piątek
- Poddębice
- Zgierz

=== Orłów County ===
- Bielawy
- Oporów
- Orłów
- Sobota
- Żychlin

== Neighbouring voivodeships ==
- Sieradz Voivodeship
- Kalisz Voivodeship
- Brześć Kujawski Voivodeship
- Rawa Voivodeship
- Sandomierz Voivodeship

== Sources ==
- Łęczyca Voivodeship, description by Zygmunt Gloger
