= Louis Mathieu =

Louis Mathieu may refer to:

- Louis-Mathieu Langlès (1763–1824), French academic, philologist, linguist, translator, author, librarian and orientalist
- Ludwik Mateusz Dembowski (1768-1812), Polish general and traveler
- Louis-Mathieu Molé (1781–1855), French statesman
- Claude-Louis Mathieu (1783–1875), French astronomer
- Louis Mathieu Verdilhan (1875–1928), French artist
