= Groszki, Łódź Voivodeship =

Groszki
- Village
- Location within Poland
- Coordinates: 52°12′54″N 19°30′43″E
- Country: Poland
- Voivodeship: Łódź
- County: Kutno
- Gmina: Bedlno

Groszki [ˈɡrɔʂki] is a village in the administrative district of Gmina Bedlno, within Kutno County, Łódź Voivodeship, in central Poland.
