= Józefów, Kutno County =

Józefów
- Village
- Location within Poland
- Coordinates: 52°10′15″N 19°38′1″E
- Country: Poland
- Voivodeship: Łódź
- County: Kutno
- Gmina: Bedlno

Józefów (Polish pronunciation: [juˈzɛfuf]) is a village in the administrative district of Gmina Bedlno, within Kutno County, Łódź Voivodeship, in central Poland.
