= Żabice, Lubusz Voivodeship =

Żabice
- Village
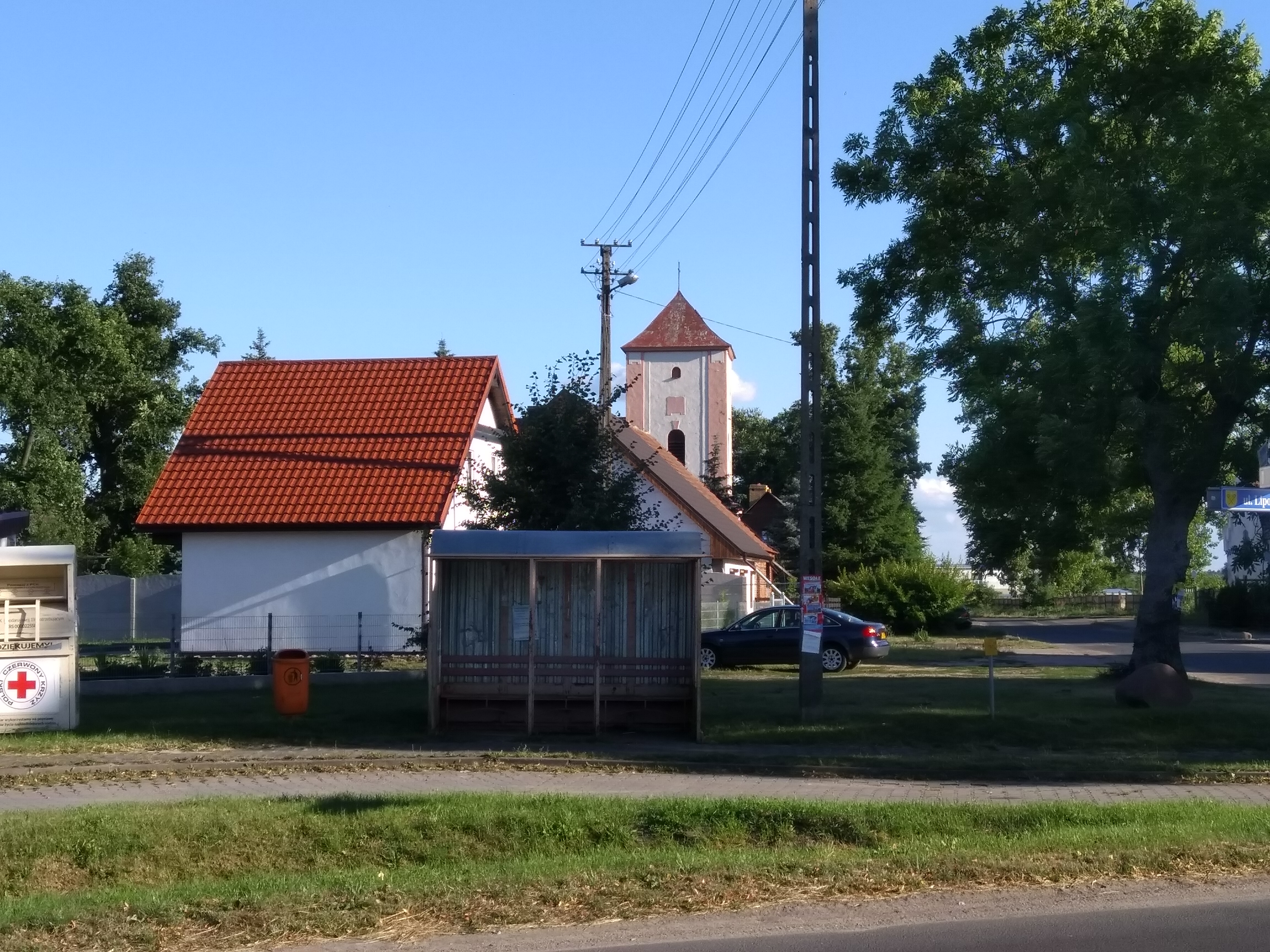

- Location within Poland
- Coordinates: 52°31′03″N 14°42′46″E
- Country: Poland
- Voivodeship: Lubusz
- County: Słubice
- Gmina: Górzyca
- Population: 530
- Website: http://www.zabice.pl/

Żabice [ʐaˈbit͡sɛ] is a village in the administrative district of Gmina Górzyca, within Słubice County, Lubusz Voivodeship, in western Poland, close to the German border.
