= Kamilew, Kutno County =

Kamilew
- Village
- Location within Poland
- Coordinates: 52°11′40″N 19°40′40″E
- Country: Poland
- Voivodeship: Łódź
- County: Kutno
- Gmina: Bedlno

Kamilew [kaˈmilɛf] is a village in the administrative district of Gmina Bedlno, within Kutno County, Łódź Voivodeship, in central Poland.
