= Wojszyce, Łódź Voivodeship =

Wojszyce
- Village
- Location within Poland
- Coordinates: 52°13′N 19°32′E
- Country: Poland
- Voivodeship: Łódź
- County: Kutno
- Gmina: Bedlno

Wojszyce [vɔjˈʂɨt͡sɛ] is a village in the administrative district of Gmina Bedlno, within Kutno County, Łódź Voivodeship, in central Poland.

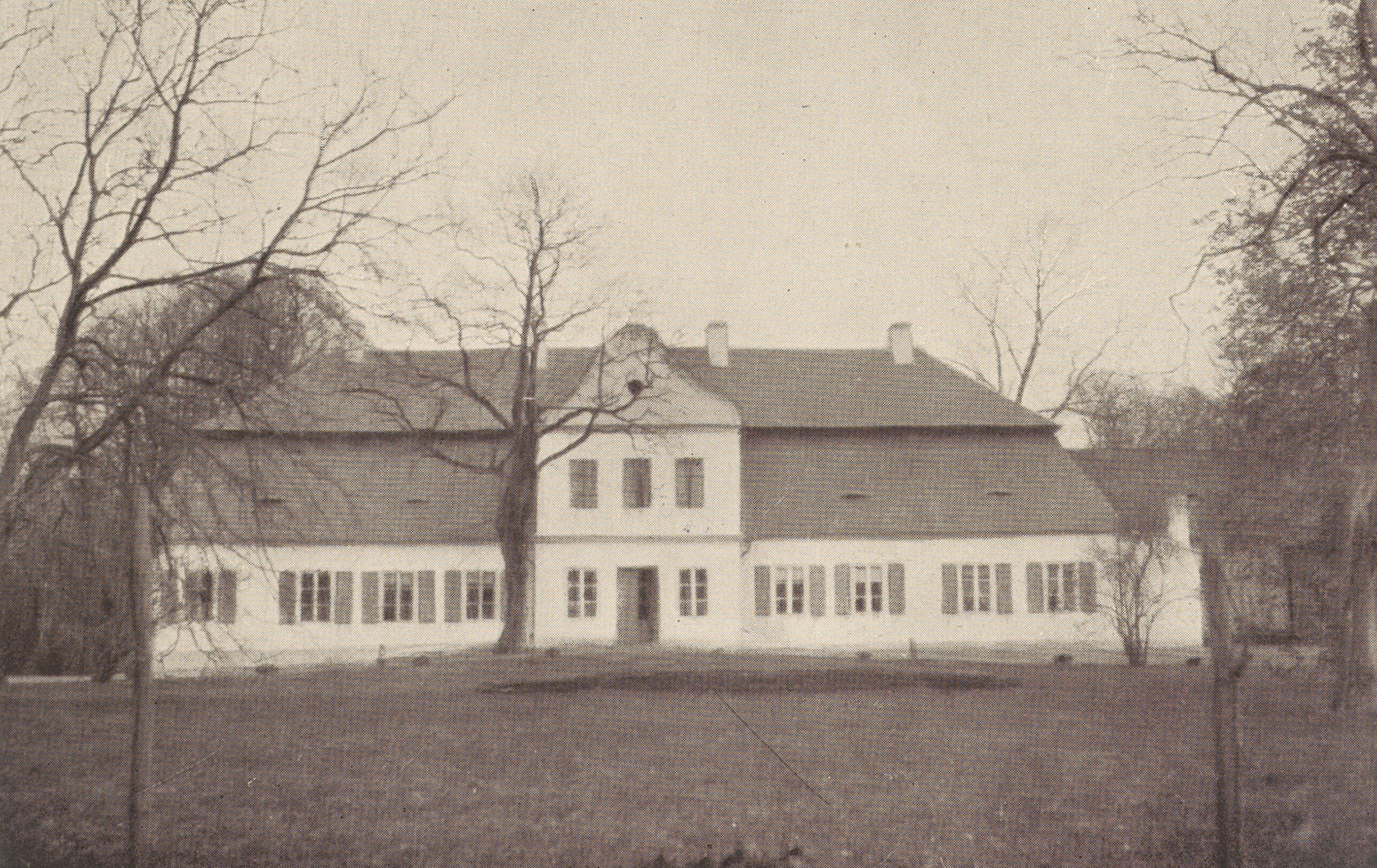
Manor house before 1911
