= Stańsk =

- Village
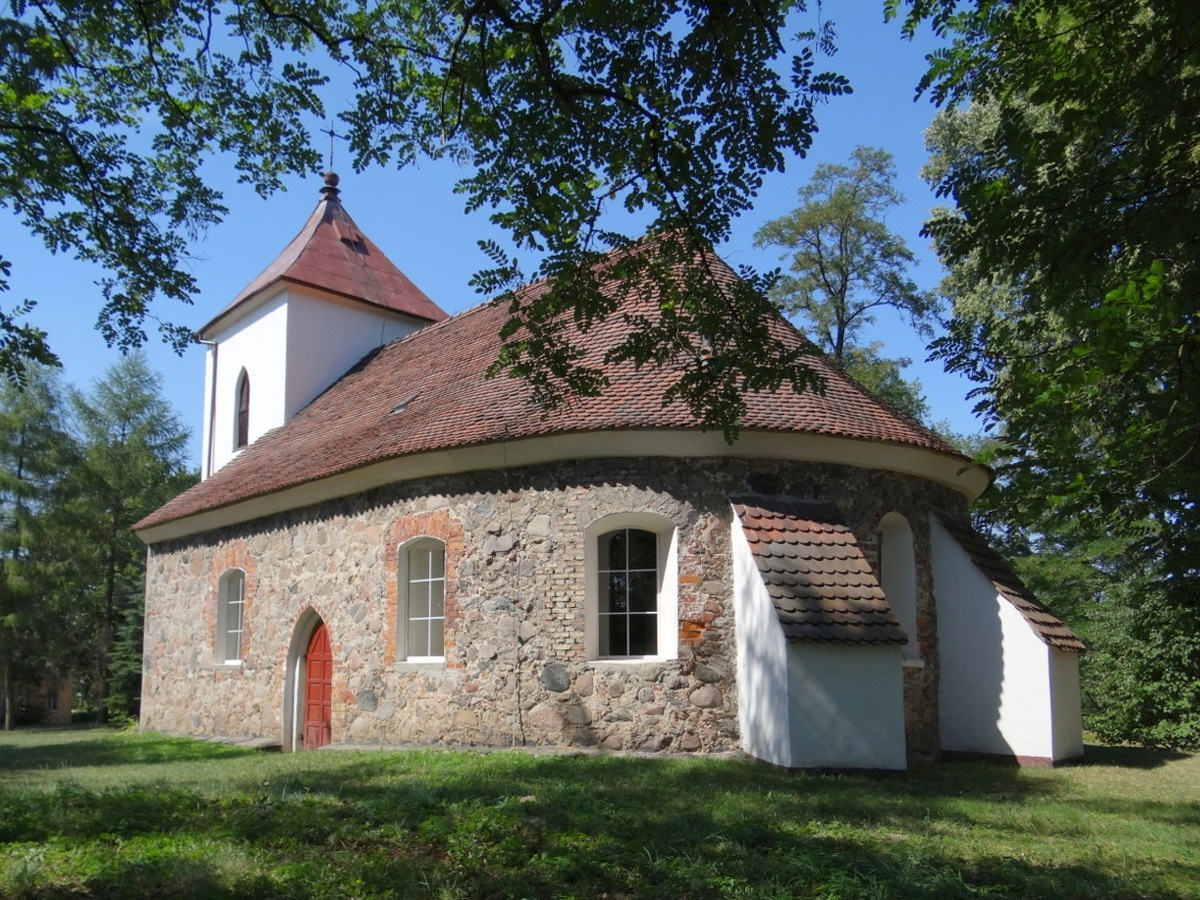
- Catholic church

- Location within Poland
- Coordinates: 52°31′N 14°47′E
- Country: Poland
- Voivodeship: Lubusz
- County: Słubice
- Gmina: Górzyca
- Population: 240

Stańsk [staɲsk] is a village in the administrative district of Gmina Górzyca, within Słubice County, Lubusz Voivodeship, in western Poland, close to the German border.
