= Kręcieszki =

- Village
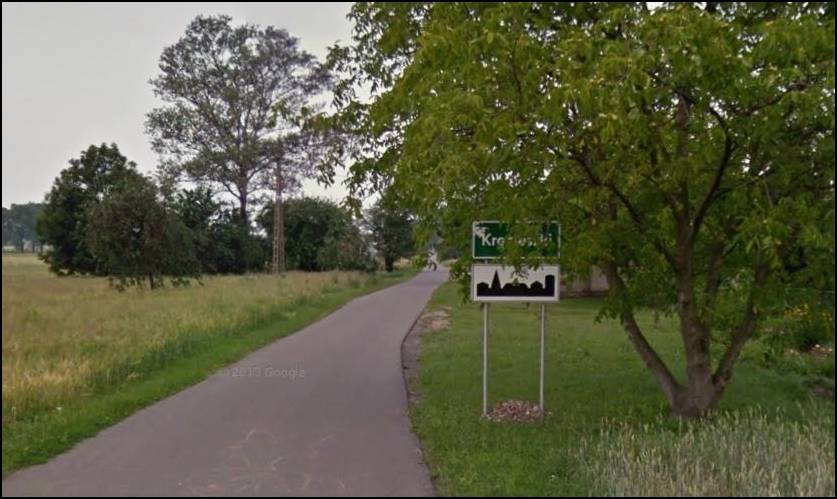
- The beginning of the village (from the west)

- Location within Poland
- Coordinates: 52°12′46″N 19°33′12″E
- Country: Poland
- Voivodeship: Łódź
- County: Kutno
- Gmina: Bedlno

Kręcieszki [krɛnˈt͡ɕɛʂki] is a village in the administrative district of Gmina Bedlno, within Kutno County, Łódź Voivodeship, in central Poland.
