= Wilkęsy, Kutno County =

Wilkęsy
- Village
- Location within Poland
- Coordinates: 52°10′20″N 19°38′51″E
- Country: Poland
- Voivodeship: Łódź
- County: Kutno
- Gmina: Bedlno

Wilkęsy [vilˈkɛ̃sɨ] is a village in the administrative district of Gmina Bedlno, within Kutno County, Łódź Voivodeship, in central Poland.
