= Gosławice, Kutno County =

Gosławice
- Village
- Location within Poland
- Coordinates: 52°7′47″N 19°36′14″E
- Country: Poland
- Voivodeship: Łódź
- County: Kutno
- Gmina: Bedlno

Gosławice [ɡɔswaˈvit͡sɛ] is a village in the administrative district of Gmina Bedlno, within Kutno County, Łódź Voivodeship, in central Poland.
