= Plecka Dąbrowa =

- Village
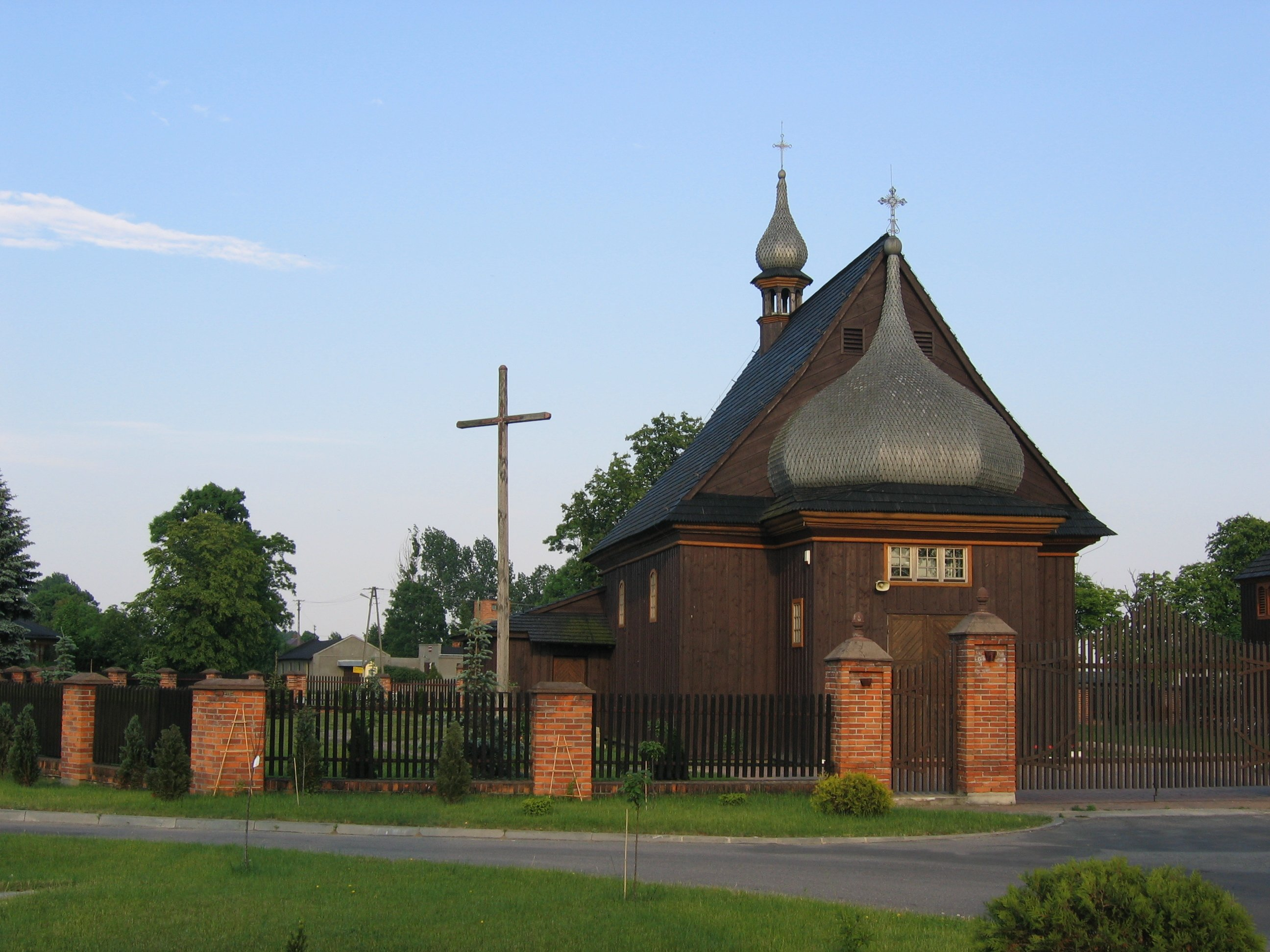
- Annunciation of the Blessed Virgin Mary Church

- Location within Poland
- Coordinates: 52°11′N 19°39′E
- Country: Poland
- Voivodeship: Łódź
- County: Kutno
- Gmina: Bedlno

Plecka Dąbrowa [ˈplɛt͡ska dɔmˈbrɔva] is a village in the administrative district of Gmina Bedlno, within Kutno County, Łódź Voivodeship, in central Poland.
