= Szewce-Walentyna =

- Village
- Location within Poland
- Coordinates: 52°11′33″N 19°31′26″E
- Country: Poland
- Voivodeship: Łódź
- County: Kutno
- Gmina: Bedlno

Szewce-Walentyna [ˈʂɛft͡sɛ valɛnˈtɨna] is a village in the administrative district of Gmina Bedlno, within Kutno County, Łódź Voivodeship, in central Poland.
