= Spycigniew of Dąbrowa Zielona =

Spycigniew of Dąbrowa Zielona (Polish: Spicygniew z Dąbrowy Zielonej) (d. between 1255 and 1257) was a wojewoda of Łęczyca.

Before 1247, he received four villages from Konrad I of Masovia: Dąbrowa Zielona, Rogaczew, Maluszyce, and Tarlino.

In 1247 or 1248, he became a wojewoda of Łęczyca. His predecessor, Bogusza of Lubań, was last time mentioned as a wojewoda of Łęczyca on June 24, 1247.

== Bibliography ==
- Bieniak Janusz: Spycigniew z Dąbrowy Zielonej. In Polski Słownik Biograficzny
