= Spudłów =

- Village
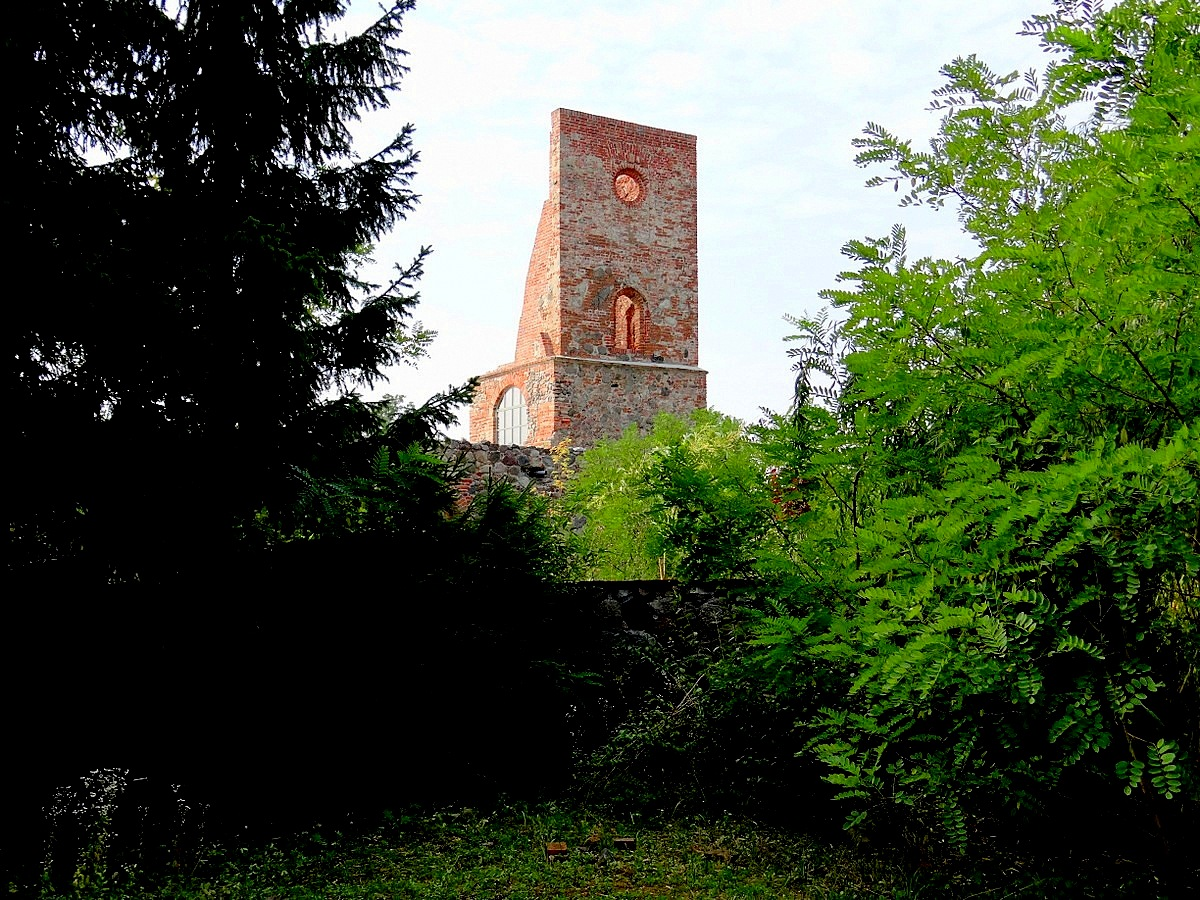

- Location within Poland
- Coordinates: 52°29′N 14°44′E
- Country: Poland
- Voivodeship: Lubusz
- County: Słubice
- Gmina: Górzyca
- Elevation: 87 m (285 ft)
- Population: 70

Spudłów [ˈspudwuf] is a village in the administrative district of Gmina Górzyca, within Słubice County, Lubusz Voivodeship, in western Poland, close to the German border.
