= Kaźmierek =

- Village
- Location within Poland
- Coordinates: 52°10′20″N 19°41′14″E
- Country: Poland
- Voivodeship: Łódź
- County: Kutno
- Gmina: Bedlno

Kaźmierek [kaʑˈmjɛrɛk] is a village in the administrative district of Gmina Bedlno, within Kutno County, Łódź Voivodeship, in central Poland.
