= Coat of arms of the Kuyavian–Pomeranian Voivodeship =

Polish coat of arms

Coat of arms of the Kuyavian-Pomeranian Voivodeship
- Armiger: Michał Sztybel, Voivode of the Kuyavian–Pomeranian Voivodeship
- Adopted: 10 July 2000
- Shield: White (silver) Iberian style escutcheon
- Compartment: Half of a red eagle facing left, joined with a half of a black lion facing right, both animals together wearing a yellow (golden) crown on their joined heads
- Use: Kuyavian-Pomeranian Voivodeship

The coat of arms of the Kuyavian-Pomeranian Voivodeship, Poland, consists of a white (silver) escutcheon, with a half of an eagle facing left, joined with a half of a lion facing right, both animals together wearing a yellow (golden) crown on their joined heads. It had been adopted in 2000.

== Design ==
The coat of arms of the Kuyavian-Pomeranian Voivodeship is a white (silver) Iberian style escutcheon with square top and rounded base. It features a charge of Kuyavian Hybride, in the form of a half of a red eagle facing left, joined with a half of a black lion facing right. Both animals together wear a yellow (golden) crown on their joined heads. The eagle has yellow (golden) beak, tongue and claws.

The design and colours of the charge comes from the coat of arms of the voivodeships of Inowrocław, and Brześć Kujawski, used from 14th to 18th centuries. The white (silver) colour of the escutcheon comes from historical coat of arms of the Chełmno Voivodeship, that also featured a white (silver) shield.

== History ==
=== Kuyavia ===
The coat of arms of the voivodeships of Inowrocław, and Brześć Kujawski from 14th to 18th centuries.

The coat of arms of the voivodeships of Łęczyca Voivodeship from 14th to 18th centuries.

The coat of arms of the voivodeships of Sieradz Voivodeship from 14th to 18th centuries.

The design of the coat of arms had originated as the symbol of the Kuyavia. The coat of arms included a charge used in the coat of arms, the Kuyavian Hybride, in the form of a half of an eagle, joined vertically with a half of a lion, both wearing together a crown on their joined heads. The design began being used in the second half of the 12th century, by the dukes of the Piast dynasty controlling that area. The oldest known usage of that design in the area, comes from the 1268 seal used by duke Ziemomysł of Kuyavia, ruler of the Duchy of Inowrocław.

Since 14th century, the charge, was used in the coat of arms of the voivodeships of Brześć Kujawski, Inowrocław, Łęczyca, and Sieradz. Both voivodeships of Brześć Kujawski, and Inowrocław, used the identical design, which featuring a black lion, joined with a red eagle, together wearing a yellow (golden) crown, placed on a yellow (golden) background. The Łęczyca Voivodeship used a coat of arms which featured a red lion, joined with a white eagle, together wearing a yellow (golden) crown. It was divided into two vertical fields, with red lion being placed on a white field, and eagle, on a red field. The Sieradz Voivodeship used a coat of arms which featured a red lion, joined with a black eagle, together wearing a yellow (golden) crown. It was divided into two vertical fields, with lion being placed on a yellow field, and eagle, on a red field. The voivodeship used their coats of arms until their disestablishment. Inowrocław Voivodeship was disestablished on 25 September 1772, while the rest, on 25 September 1793.

=== Chełmno Voivodeship ===
The coat of arms of voivodeships of Chełmno in the Kingdom of Poland used from 1466 to 1772, in the version with black eagle on a white background.

The voivodeship of Chełmno of the Kingdom of Poland was established in a 1454 order of king Casimir IV Jagiellon. It began functioning in 1466, following the signing of the Second Peace of Thorn. The king had also established their coat of arms.

There were two known versions of the coat of arms, that served as the symbol of the voivodeship. One depicted a black eagle, with a golden (yellow) crown on its neck, from which reaches an arm in silver armour, holding a sword above the head of the bird, turned to the viewer's left. It is placed on a white (silver) background. Other version depicted a white eagle, with a golden (yellow) crown on its neck, from which reaches an arm in silver armour, holding a sword above the head of the bird, turned to the viewer's left. It is placed on a red background.

Such coat of arms was also the symbol of the Malbork Voivodeship, and Royal Prussia.

The Chełmno Voivodeship, ceased to exist in 1793, during the Second Partition of Poland.

=== Toruń Voivodeship ===
The coat of arms of the Kuyavian-Pomeranian Voivodeship, used from 1995 to 1998.

Prior to establishment of the Kuyavian-Pomeranian Voivodeship, within its current borders, from 1975 to 1998, existed the Toruń Voivodeship. Its coat of arms had been adopted on 12 May 1995, and remained in use until 31 December 1998, when the voivodeship ceased to exist. It consisted of the red Iberian-style escutcheon (shield), with square top and pointed bottom. It featured a white (silver) eagle with raised wings, and its head turned right. It had orange (golden) beak, tongue, and legs. On his chest was placed an orange (golden) crown, with his head going through it. From its back, on its right, was coming out a hand in the steel armor, holding a sword, over its head. They had grey colour.

=== Kuyavian-Pomeranian Voivodeship ===
The Kuyavian-Pomeranian Voivodeship was established on was established on 1 January 1999. Its coat of arms had been adopted by the Kuyavian-Pomeranian Voivodeship Sejmik on 10 July 2000.

== Gallery ==
=== Coats of arms and seals of Polish kings containing the coat of arms of Kuyavia ===
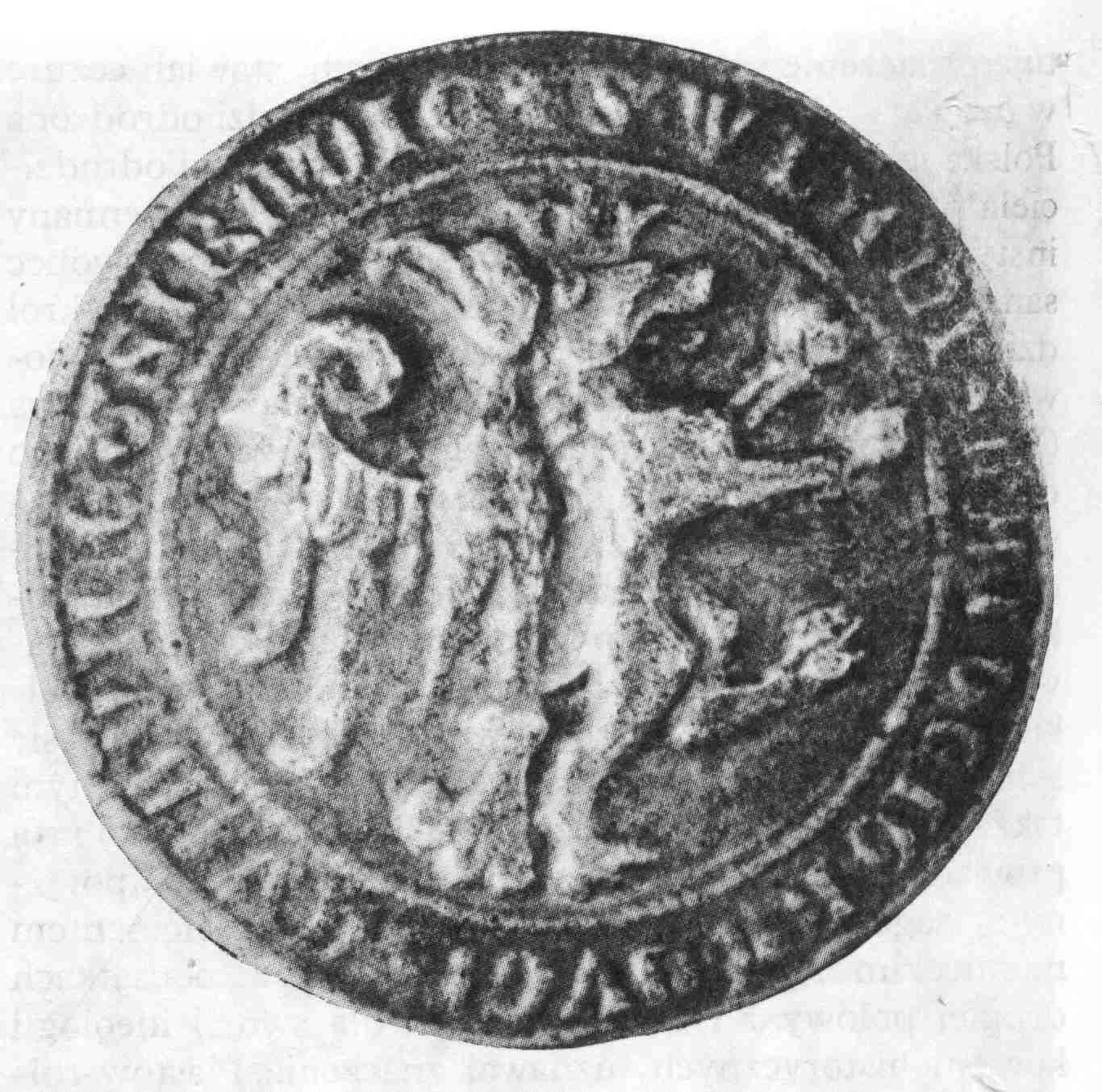
Seal of Władysław the Elbow-high

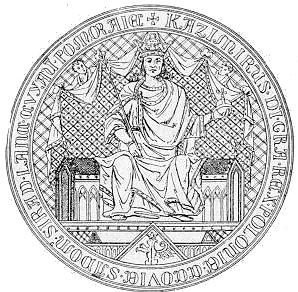
Seal of Casimir the Great

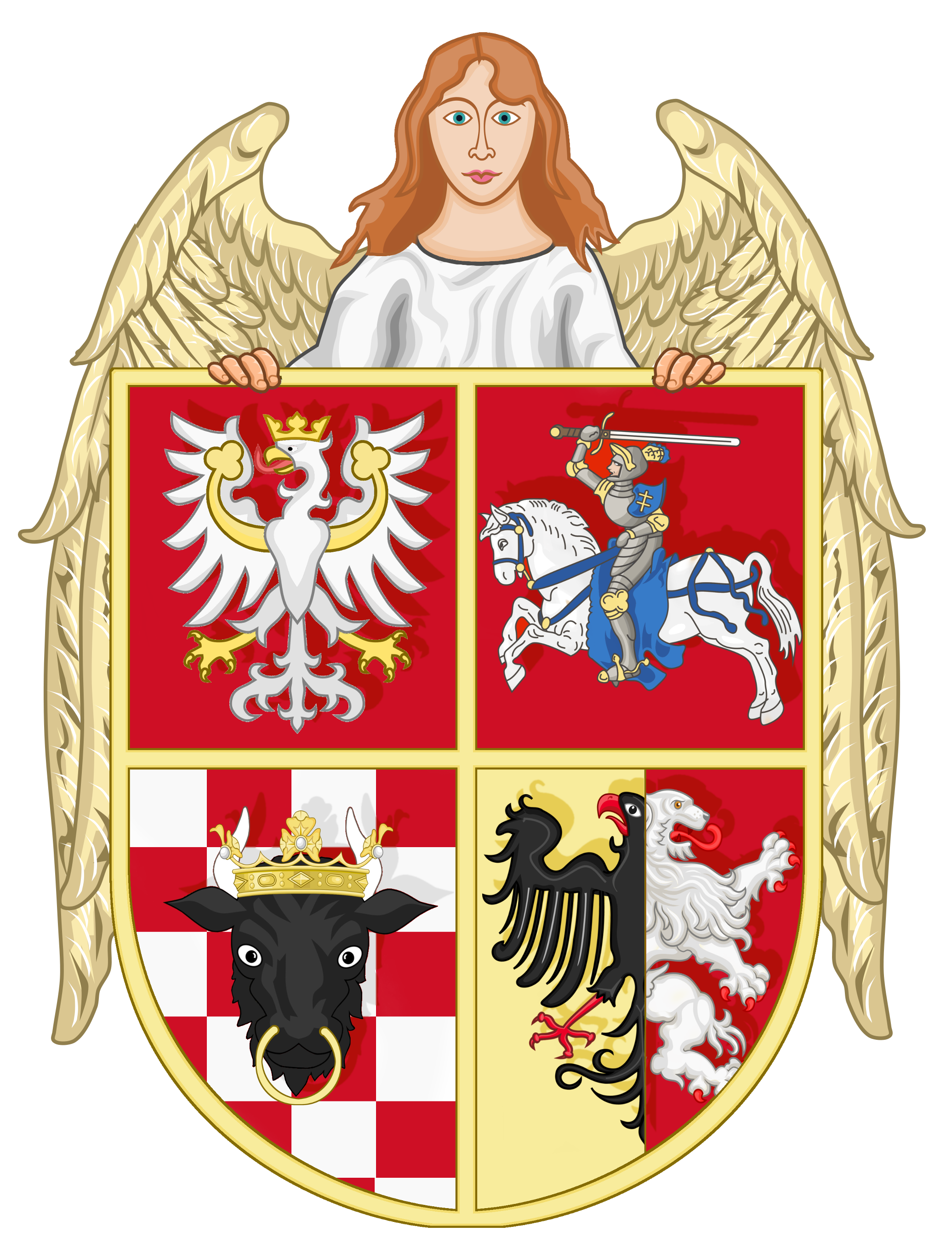
Coat of arms of Władysław II Jagiełło

Coat of arms of Władysław Warneńczyk

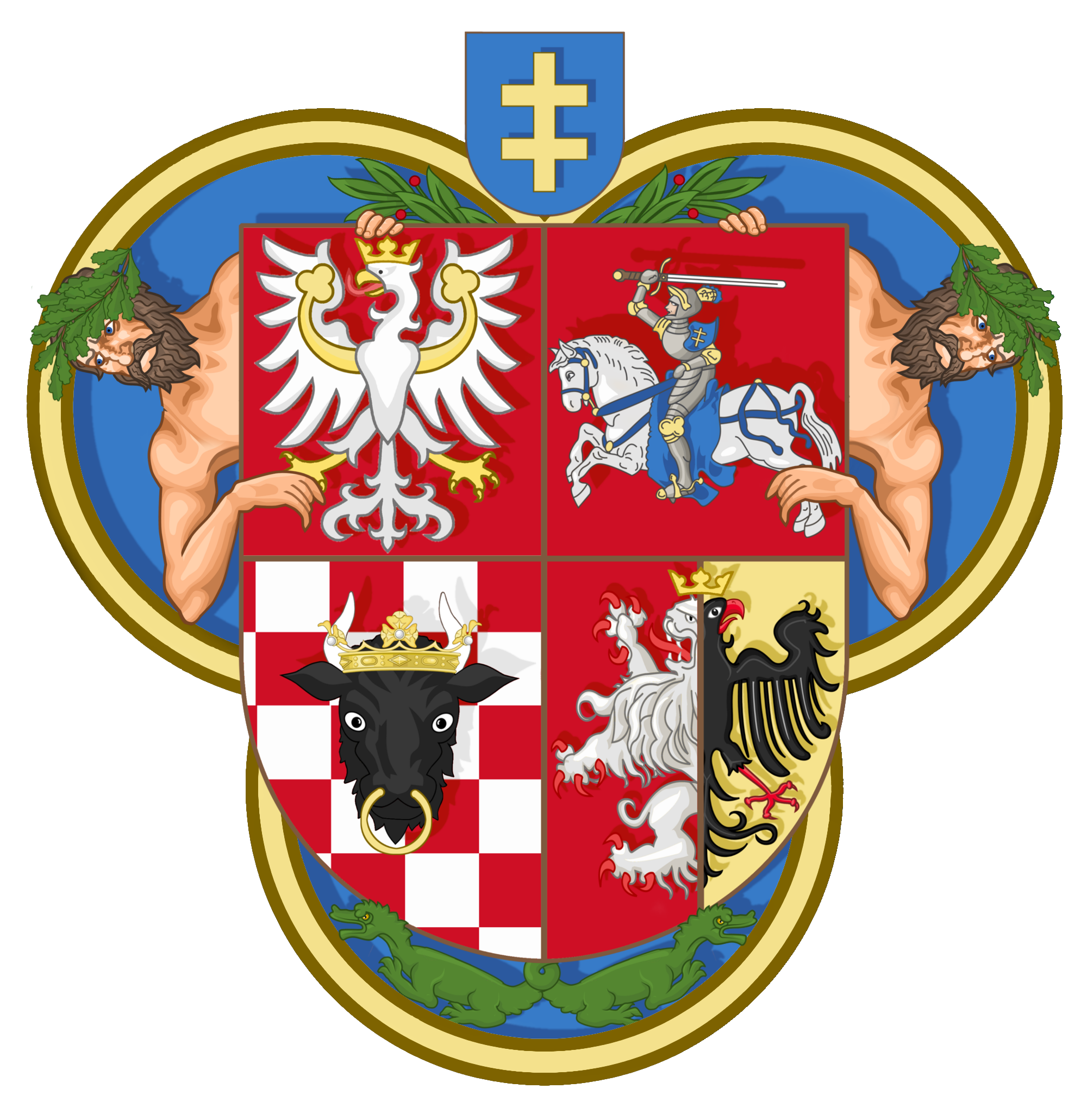
Seal of Casimir IV Jagiellon

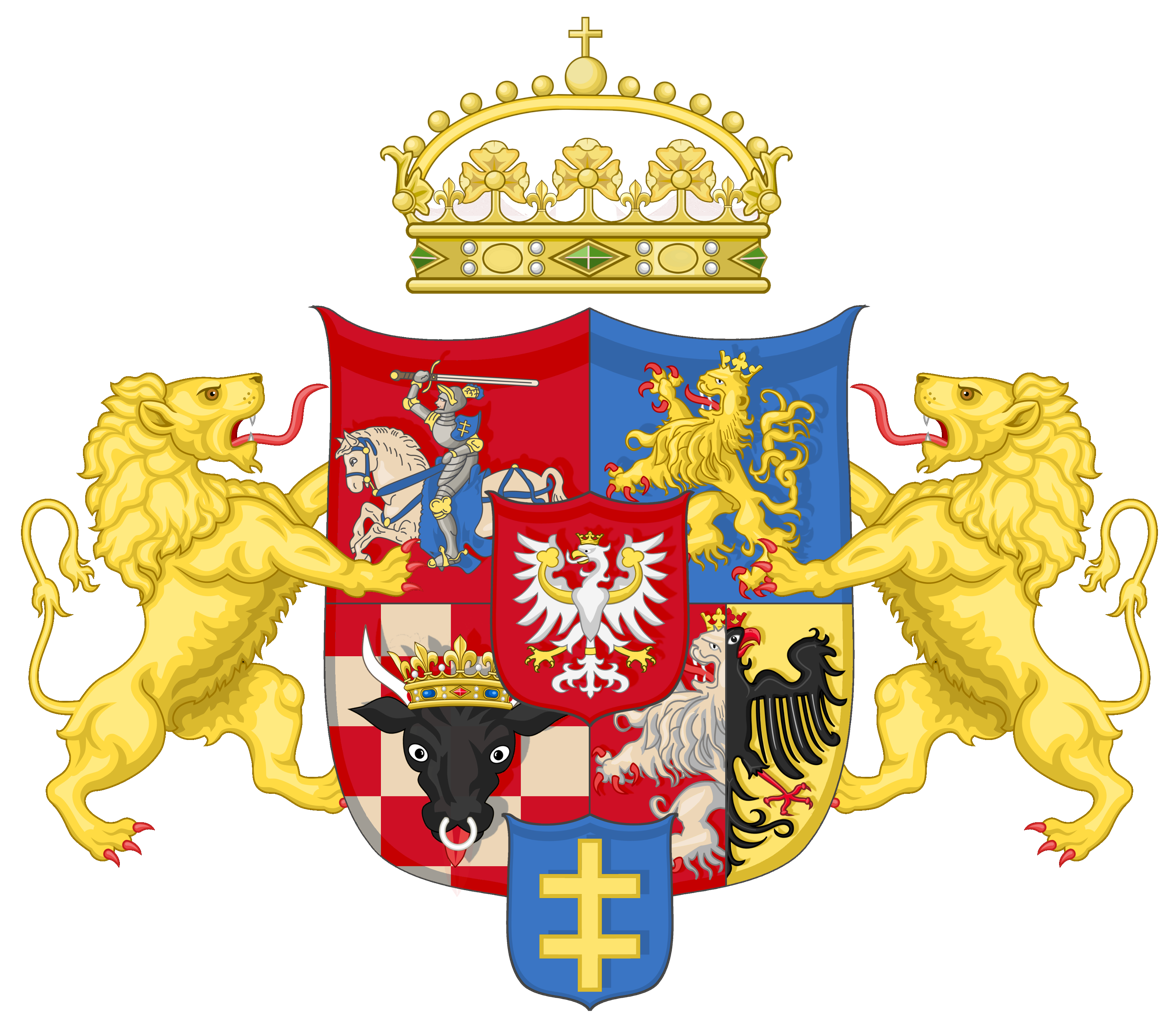
Coat of arms of Jan I Olbracht

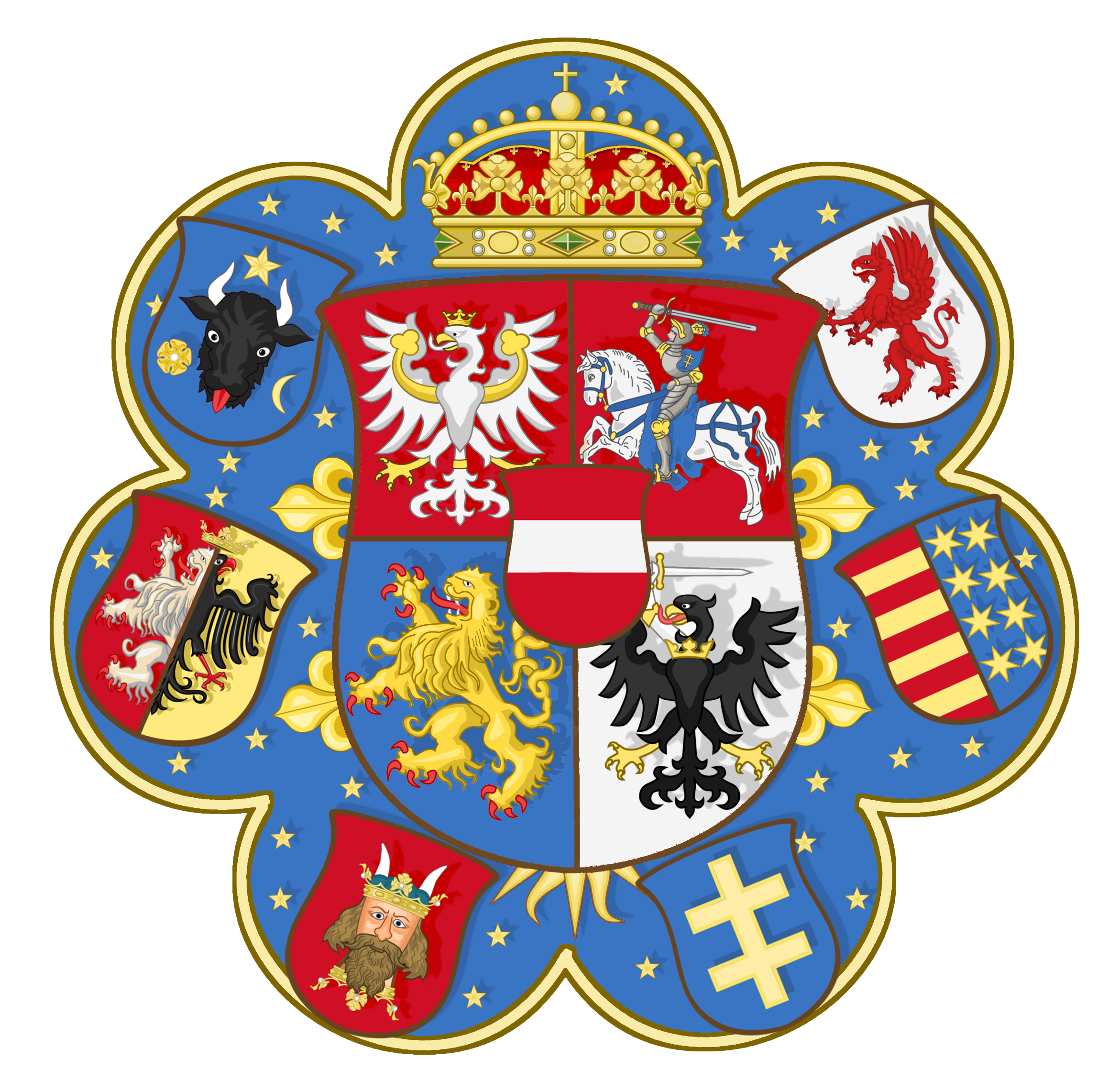
Seal of Alexander Jagiellon

== See also ==
- flag of the Kuyavian-Pomeranian Voivodeship
