= Pamięcin, Lubusz Voivodeship =

Pamięcin
- Village
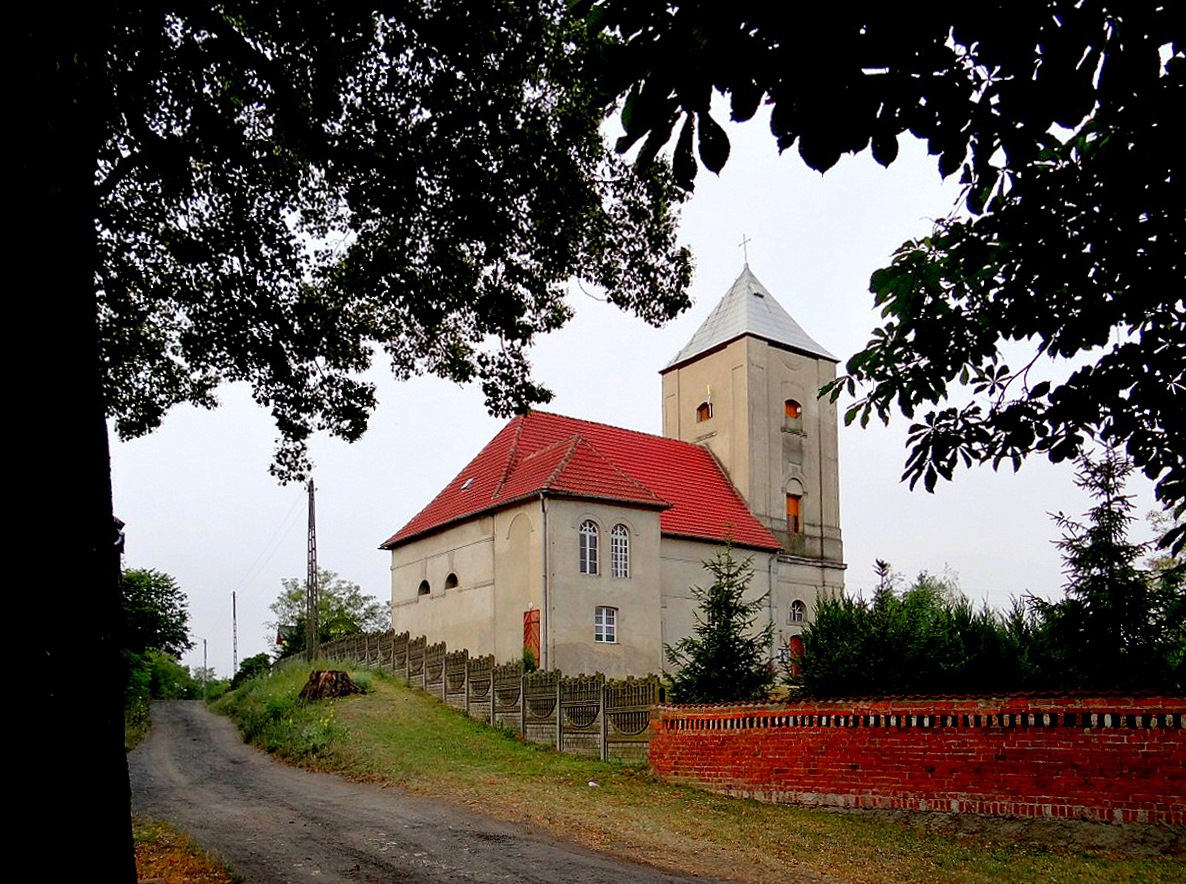
- Church of the Assumption of the Blessed Virgin Mary

- Location within Poland
- Coordinates: 52°27′N 14°39′E
- Country: Poland
- Voivodeship: Lubusz
- County: Słubice
- Gmina: Górzyca

Population
  - Total: 410

Pamięcin [paˈmjɛnt͡ɕin] (German: Frauendorf) is a village in the administrative district of Gmina Górzyca, within Słubice County, Lubusz Voivodeship, in western Poland, close to the German border.
