= Żeronice, Łódź Voivodeship =

Żeronice
- Village
- Location within Poland
- Coordinates: 52°8′50″N 19°36′14″E
- Country: Poland
- Voivodeship: Łódź
- County: Kutno
- Gmina: Bedlno

Żeronice [ʐɛrɔˈnit͡sɛ] is a village in the administrative district of Gmina Bedlno, within Kutno County, Łódź Voivodeship, in central Poland.
