= Konstantynów, Kutno County =

Konstantynów
- Village
- Location within Poland
- Coordinates: 52°10′N 19°33′E
- Country: Poland
- Voivodeship: Łódź
- County: Kutno
- Gmina: Bedlno

Konstantynów [kɔnstanˈtɨnuf] is a village in the administrative district of Gmina Bedlno, within Kutno County, Łódź Voivodeship, in central Poland.
