= Gmina Górzyca =

Gmina Górzyca Górzyca Commune
- Gmina
- Flag Coat of arms
- Interactive map of Gmina Górzyca
- Coordinates (Górzyca): 52°29′41″N 14°39′18″E
- Country: Poland
- Voivodeship: Lubusz
- County: Słubice
- Seat: Górzyca

Area
  - Total: 145.55 km^{2} (56.20 sq mi)

Population (2019-06-30)
  - Total: 4,294
  - Density: 29.50/km^{2} (76.41/sq mi)
- Website: http://gmina.gorzyca.pl/

Gmina Górzyca is a rural gmina (administrative district) in Słubice County, Lubusz Voivodeship, in western Poland, on the German border. Its seat is the village of Górzyca, which lies approximately 18 kilometres (11 mi) north of Słubice and 49 km (30 mi) south-west of Gorzów Wielkopolski.

The gmina covers an area of 145.55 square kilometres (56.2 sq mi), and as of 2019 its total population is 4,294.

== Villages ==
Gmina Górzyca contains the villages and settlements of Chyrzyno, Czarnów, Górzyca, Laski Lubuskie, Ługi Górzyckie, Owczary, Pamięcin, Radówek, Spudłów, Stańsk, Żabczyn and Żabice.

== Neighbouring gminas ==
Gmina Górzyca is bordered by the town of Kostrzyn nad Odrą and by the gminas of Ośno Lubuskie, Rzepin, Słońsk and Słubice. It also borders Germany.
