= Stradzew, Kutno County =

Stradzew
- Village
- Location within Poland
- Coordinates: 52°10′24″N 19°35′41″E
- Country: Poland
- Voivodeship: Łódź
- County: Kutno
- Gmina: Bedlno

Stradzew [ˈstrad͡zɛf] is a village in the administrative district of Gmina Bedlno, within Kutno County, Łódź Voivodeship, in central Poland.
