= Chyrzyno =

- Settlement
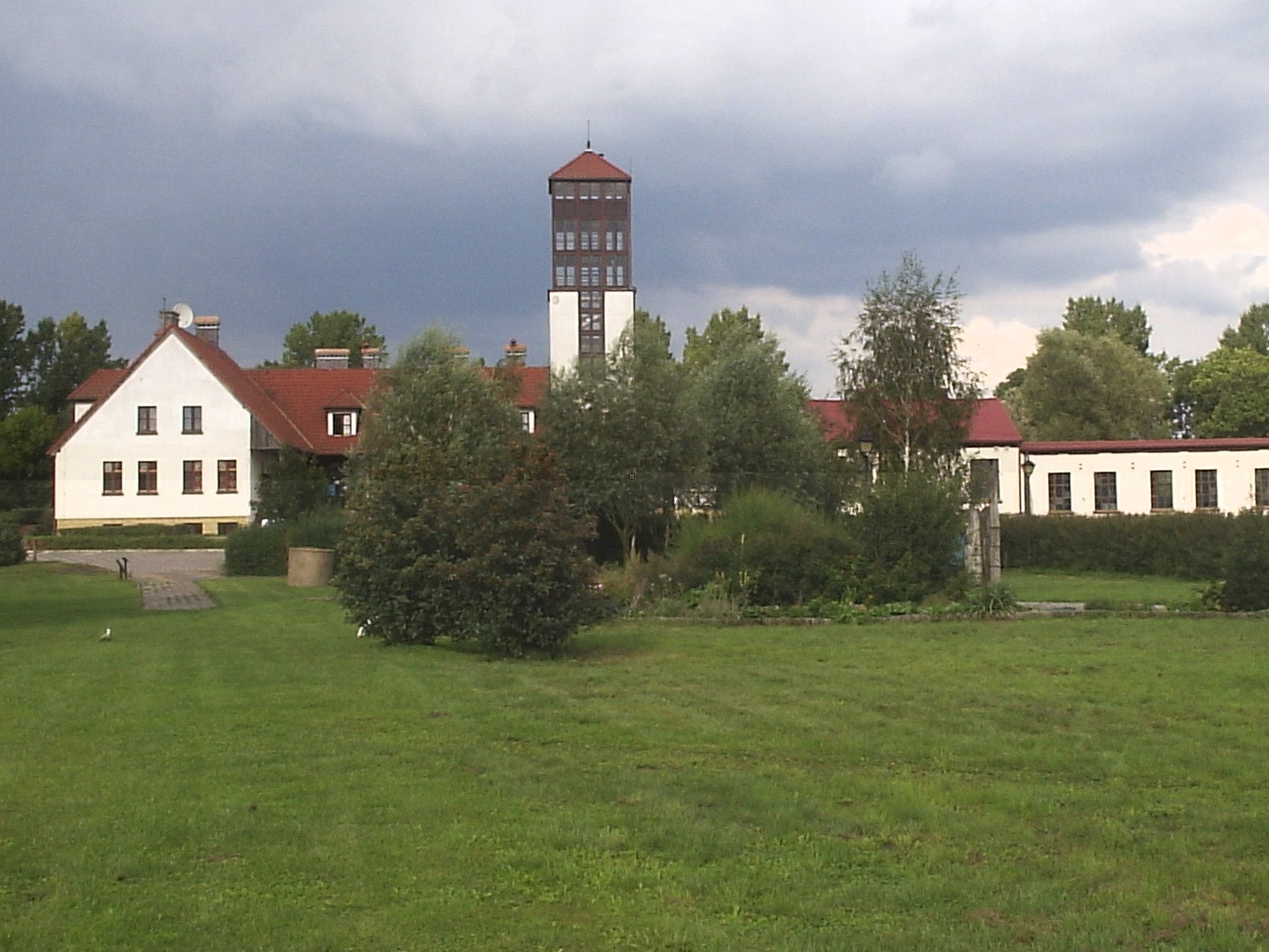

- Location within Poland
- Coordinates: 52°34′8″N 14°39′5″E
- Country: Poland
- Voivodeship: Lubusz
- County: Słubice
- Gmina: Górzyca
- Population: 5

Chyrzyno [xɨˈʐɨnɔ] is a settlement in the administrative district of Gmina Górzyca, within Słubice County, Lubusz Voivodeship, in western Poland, close to the German border.
