= Waliszew, Łódź Voivodeship =

Waliszew
- Village
- Location within Poland
- Coordinates: 52°9′44″N 19°32′33″E
- Country: Poland
- Voivodeship: Łódź
- County: Kutno
- Gmina: Bedlno

Waliszew [vaˈliʂɛf] is a village in the administrative district of Gmina Bedlno, within Kutno County, Łódź Voivodeship, in central Poland.
