= Gmina Bedlno =

Gmina Bedlno Bedlno Commune
- Gmina
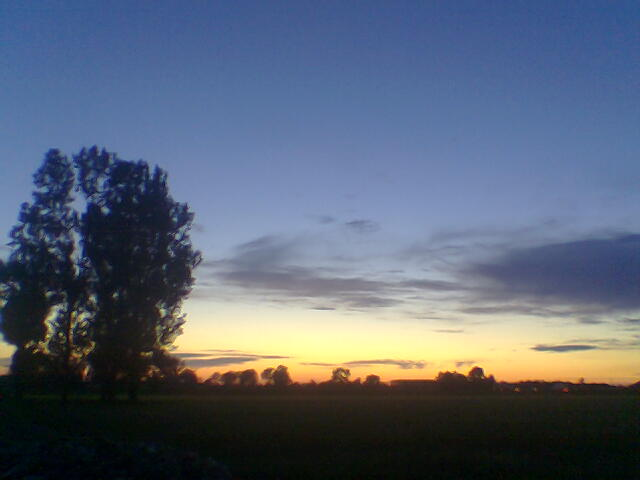

- Flag Coat of arms
- Interactive map of Gmina Bedlno
- Coordinates (Bedlno): 52°12′22″N 19°34′28″E
- Country: Poland
- Voivodeship: Łódź
- County: Kutno
- Seat: Bedlno

Area
  - Total: 126.02 km^{2} (48.66 sq mi)

Population (2006)
  - Total: 6,153
  - Density: 48.83/km^{2} (126.5/sq mi)
- Time zone: UTC+1 (CET)
  - Summer (DST): UTC+2 (CEST)
- Website: www.bedlno.pl

Gmina Bedlno is a rural gmina (administrative district) in Kutno County, Łódź Voivodeship, in central Poland. Its seat is the village of Bedlno, which lies 15 kilometres (9 mi) east of Kutno and 48 km (30 mi) north of the regional capital Łódź.

The gmina covers an area of 126.02 square kilometres (48.7 sq mi), and as of 2006 had a total population of 6,153.

== Villages ==
Gmina Bedlno contains the villages and settlements of:

- Annetów
- Antoniew
- Bedlno
- Czarnów
- Dębowa Góra
- Ernestynów
- Florianów
- Garbów
- Głuchów
- Gosławice
- Groszki
- Janów
- Jaroszówka
- Józefów
- Kamilew
- Karolew
- Kaźmierek
- Konstantynów
- Kręcieszki
- Kujawki
- Mateuszew
- Nowe Bedlno
- Nowy Franciszków
- Orłów
- Orłów-Kolonia
- Orłów-Parcel
- Plecka Dąbrowa
- Pniewo
- Potok
- Ruszki
- Stanisławice
- Stradzew
- Szewce Nadolne
- Szewce Nagórne
- Szewce Owsiane
- Szewce-Walentyna
- Tomczyce
- Waliszew
- Wewiórz
- Wilkęsy
- Wojszyce
- Wola Kałkowa
- Wyrów
- Załusin
- Żeronice
- Zleszyn
- Zosinów

== Neighbouring gminas ==
Gmina Bedlno is bordered by the gminas of Bielawy, Krzyżanów, Oporów, Piątek, Zduny and Żychlin.
