= Żabczyn =

- Village
- Location within Poland
- Coordinates: 52°33′32″N 14°40′25″E
- Country: Poland
- Voivodeship: Lubusz
- County: Słubice
- Gmina: Górzyca

Population
  - Total: 20
- Website: http://www.zabczyn.pl/

Żabczyn [ˈʐapt͡ʂɨn] is a village in the administrative district of Gmina Górzyca, within Słubice County, Lubusz Voivodeship, in western Poland, close to the German border.
