= Flag of Kuyavian–Pomeranian Voivodeship =

Flag of the Kuyavian-Pomeranian Voivodeship, Poland

Flag of the Kuyavian-Pomeranian Voivodeship
- Use: Kuyavian-Pomeranian Voivodeship
- Proportion: 5:8
- Adopted: 10 July 2000
- Design: Three horizontal stripes of red, white, and black colour, with the middle stripe being twice the size of the other ones
- Designed by: Lech Tadeusz Karczewski

The flag of the Kuyavian-Pomeranian Voivodeship, Poland is a tricolour rectangle, with three horizontal stripes: red, white, and black, with white stripe in the middle being twice the size of the other ones.

== Design ==
The flag of the Kuyavian-Pomeranian Voivodeship is a tricolour rectangle, with the aspect ratio of height to width of 5:8. It consist of three horizontal stripes: red, white, and black, with white stripe being twice the size of the other ones. The proportion of three stripes are: 1/4 for red and black, and 1/2 for white.

The design of the flag had been based on the colours of the coat of arms of the voivodeship. The middle white stripe had been enlarged to differentiate the flag from other red-white-black flags, such as former flag of the German Empire.

== History ==
The flag had been adopted by the Kuyavian-Pomeranian Voivodeship Sejmik, on 10 July 2000, in the resolution no. 444/2000. It had been designed in May 2000 by Lech Tadeusz Karczewski, based on the proposition by Jan Kazimierz Wroniszewski. The design of the flag had been based on the colours of the coat of arms of the voivodeship.

== See also ==
- coat of arms of the Kuyavian-Pomeranian Voivodeship
