= Wewiórz =

- Village
- Location within Poland
- Coordinates: 52°8′40″N 19°39′21″E
- Country: Poland
- Voivodeship: Łódź
- County: Kutno
- Gmina: Bedlno
- Population: 60

Wewiórz [ˈvɛvjuʂ] is a village in the administrative district of Gmina Bedlno, within Kutno County, Łódź Voivodeship, in central Poland.
