= Bedlno, Łódź Voivodeship =

Bedlno
- Village
- Location within Poland
- Coordinates: 52°12′22″N 19°34′28″E
- Country: Poland
- Voivodeship: Łódź
- County: Kutno
- Gmina: Bedlno
- Population: 640

Bedlno [ˈbɛdlnɔ] is a village in Kutno County, Łódź Voivodeship, in central Poland. It is the seat of the gmina (administrative district) called Gmina Bedlno.
