= Nowe Bedlno =

- Village
- Country: Poland
- Voivodeship: Łódź
- County: Kutno
- Gmina: Bedlno

Nowe Bedlno [ˈnɔvɛ ˈbɛdlnɔ] is a village in the administrative district of Gmina Bedlno, within Kutno County, Łódź Voivodeship, in central Poland.
