= Potok, Kutno County =

Potok
- Village
- Location within Poland
- Coordinates: 52°8′59″N 19°32′31″E
- Country: Poland
- Voivodeship: Łódź
- County: Kutno
- Gmina: Bedlno
- Time zone: UTC+1 (CET)
  - Summer (DST): UTC+2 (CEST)
- Postal code: 99-311
- ISO 3166 code: POL

Potok [ˈpɔtɔk] is a village in the administrative district of Gmina Bedlno, within Kutno County, Łódź Voivodeship, in central Poland.
