= Karolew, Gmina Bedlno =

Karolew
- Village
- Location within Poland
- Coordinates: 52°12′41″N 19°39′1″E
- Country: Poland
- Voivodeship: Łódź
- County: Kutno
- Gmina: Bedlno

Karolew [kaˈrɔlɛf] is a village in the administrative district of Gmina Bedlno, within Kutno County, Łódź Voivodeship, in central Poland.
