= Ludwik Mateusz Dembowski =

Polish general

Ludwik Mateusz Dembowski, also known as Louis-Mathieu Dembowski (1768, Dębowa Góra, Poland - 1812, Valladolid, Spain), was a Polish general and traveler.

After the fall of the Kościuszko Uprising went to France. He served in Polish Legions under Jan Henryk Dąbrowski, and with the French Army sent to Santo Domingo.
