= Szewce Owsiane =

- Village
- Location within Poland
- Coordinates: 52°11′N 19°32′E
- Country: Poland
- Voivodeship: Łódź
- County: Kutno
- Gmina: Bedlno

Szewce Owsiane [ˈʂɛft͡sɛ ɔfˈɕanɛ] is a village in the administrative district of Gmina Bedlno, within Kutno County, Łódź Voivodeship, in central Poland.
