= Nowy Franciszków, Łódź Voivodeship =

Nowy Franciszków
- Village
- Location within Poland
- Coordinates: 52°12′7″N 19°38′28″E
- Country: Poland
- Voivodeship: Łódź
- County: Kutno
- Gmina: Bedlno

Nowy Franciszków (Polish pronunciation: [ˈnɔvɨ fraɲˈt͡ɕiʂkuf]) is a village in the administrative district of Gmina Bedlno, within Kutno County, Łódź Voivodeship, in central Poland.
