= Laski Lubuskie =

- Village
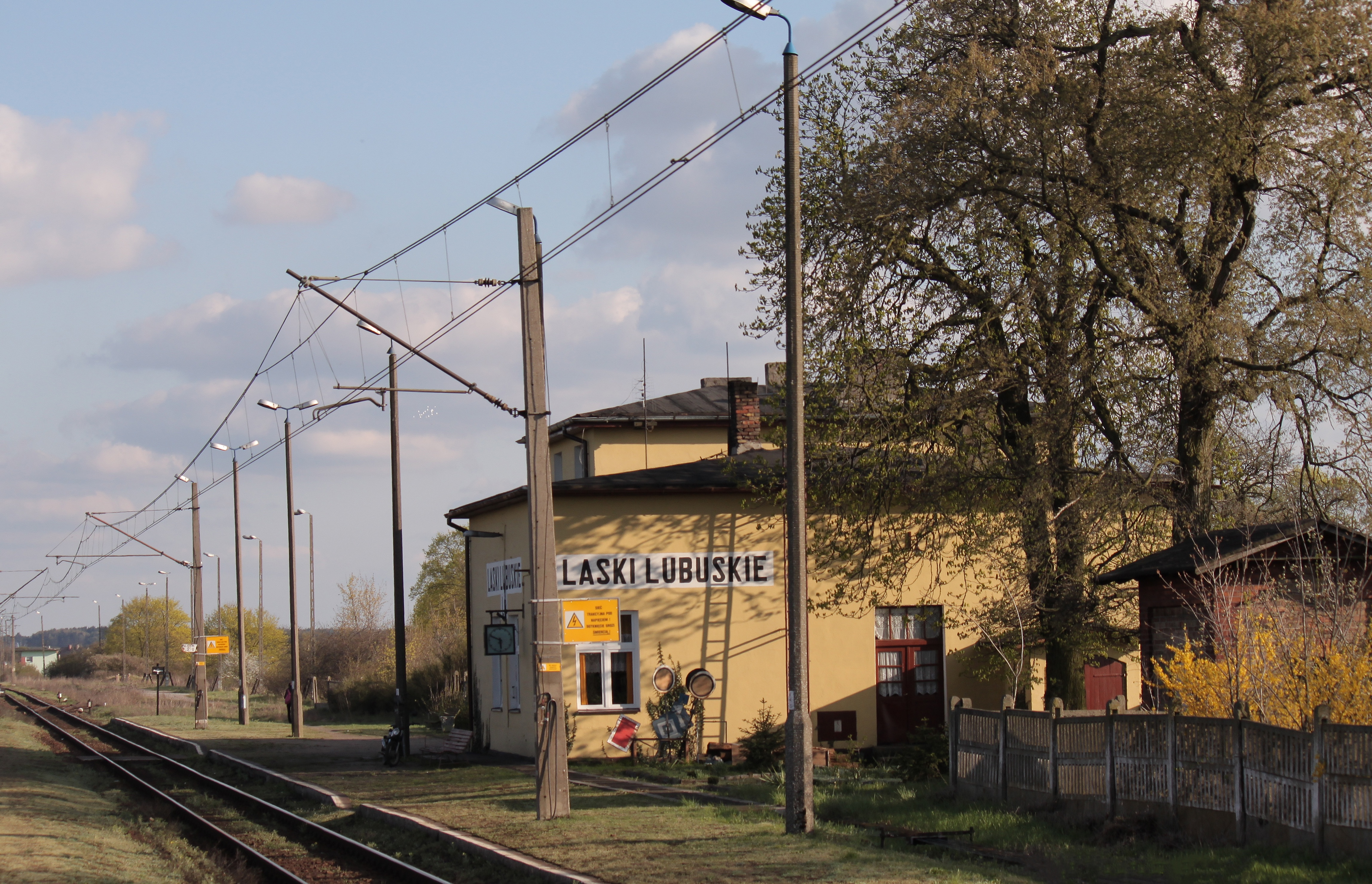
- Railway station

- Location within Poland
- Coordinates: 52°27′39″N 14°41′29″E
- Country: Poland
- Voivodeship: Lubusz
- County: Słubice
- Gmina: Górzyca
- Population: 220

Laski Lubuskie (Polish pronunciation: [ˈlaskʲi luˈbuskʲɛ]) is a village in the administrative district of Gmina Górzyca, within Słubice County, Lubusz Voivodeship, in western Poland, close to the German border.
