= Wola Kałkowa =

- Village
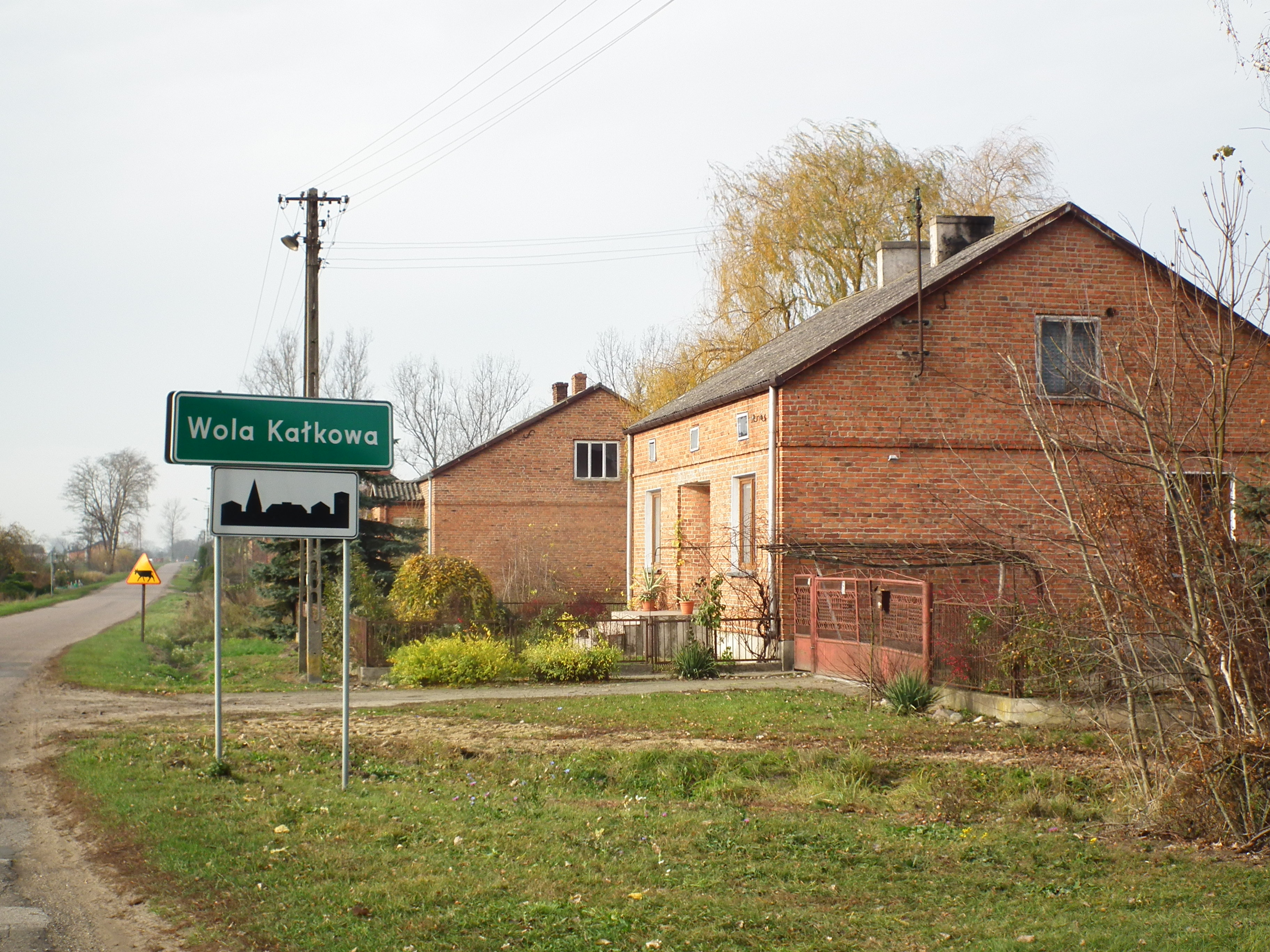

- Location within Poland
- Coordinates: 52°7′N 19°37′E
- Country: Poland
- Voivodeship: Łódź
- County: Kutno
- Gmina: Bedlno

Wola Kałkowa [ˈvɔla kau̯ˈkɔva] is a village in the administrative district of Gmina Bedlno, within Kutno County, Łódź Voivodeship, in central Poland.
