= Głuchów, Kutno County =

Głuchów
- Village
- Location within Poland
- Coordinates: 52°9′31″N 19°39′29″E
- Country: Poland
- Voivodeship: Łódź
- County: Kutno
- Gmina: Bedlno
- Population: 130

Głuchów [ˈɡwuxuf] is a village in the administrative district of Gmina Bedlno, within Kutno County, Łódź Voivodeship, in central Poland.
