= Owczary, Lubusz Voivodeship =

Owczary
- Village
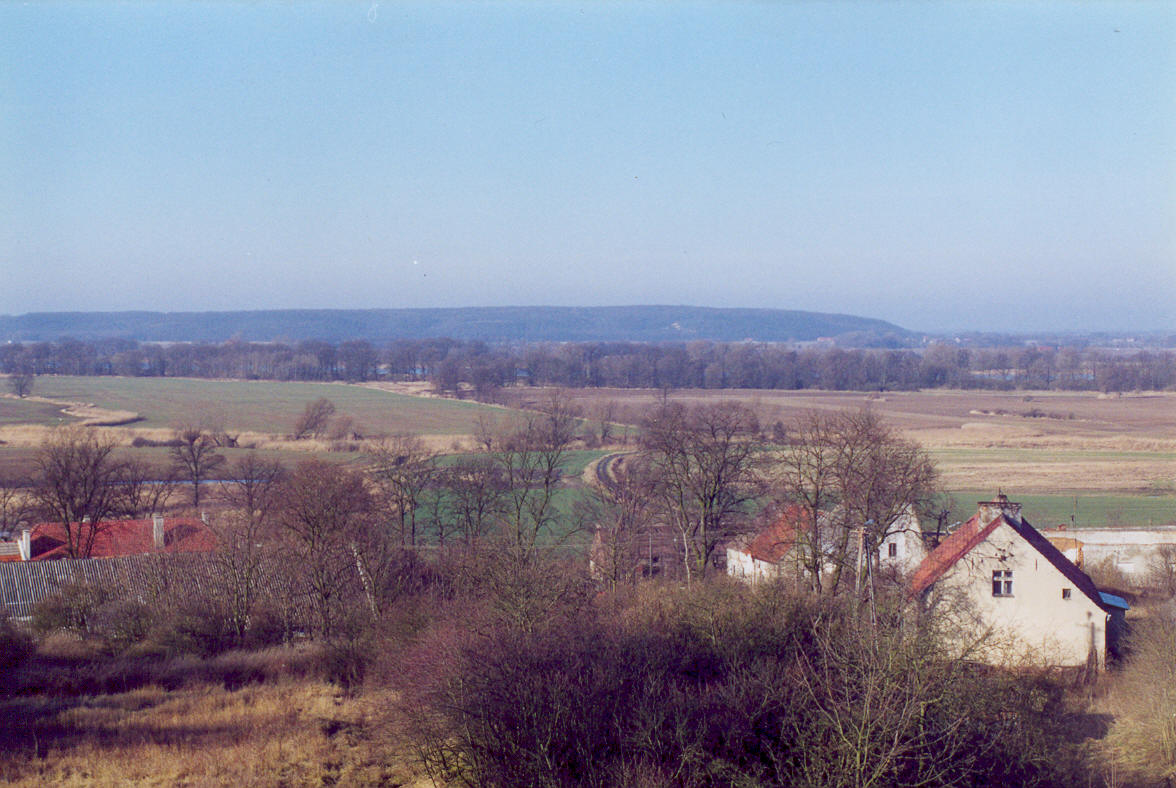

- Location within Poland
- Coordinates: 52°28′N 14°38′E
- Country: Poland
- Voivodeship: Lubusz
- County: Słubice
- Gmina: Górzyca
- Population: 130

Owczary [ɔfˈt͡ʂarɨ] is a village in the administrative district of Gmina Górzyca, within Słubice County, Lubusz Voivodeship, in western Poland, close to the German border.
