= Annetów =

- Village
- Location within Poland
- Coordinates: 52°12′2″N 19°39′13″E
- Country: Poland
- Voivodeship: Łódź
- County: Kutno
- Gmina: Bedlno

Annetów [anˈnɛtuf] is a village in the administrative district of Gmina Bedlno, within Kutno County, Łódź Voivodeship, in central Poland.
