= Szewce Nadolne =

- Village
- Location within Poland
- Coordinates: 52°10′N 19°32′E
- Country: Poland
- Voivodeship: Łódź
- County: Kutno
- Gmina: Bedlno

Szewce Nadolne [ˈʂɛft͡sɛ naˈdɔlnɛ] is a village in the administrative district of Gmina Bedlno, within Kutno County, Łódź Voivodeship, in central Poland. According to the 2021 Polish population census, Szewce Nadolne has about 80 residents.
