= Ługi Górzyckie =

- Village
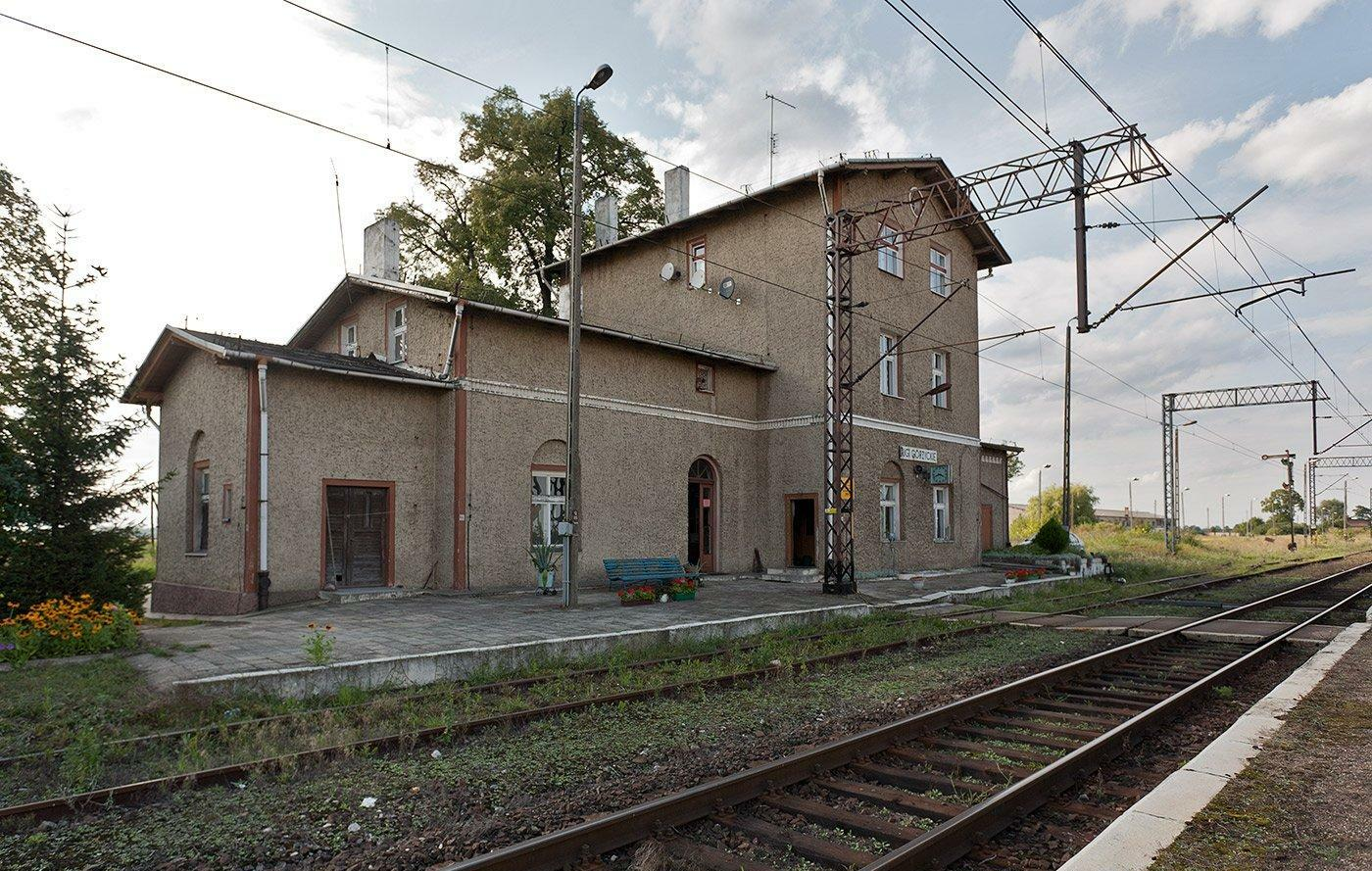
- Railway station

- Location within Poland
- Coordinates: 52°32′00″N 14°38′00″E
- Country: Poland
- Voivodeship: Lubusz
- County: Słubice
- Gmina: Górzyca
- Population: 140

Ługi Górzyckie [ˈwuɡi ɡuˈʐɨt͡skʲɛ] is a village in the administrative district of Gmina Górzyca, within Słubice County, Lubusz Voivodeship, in western Poland, close to the German border.
