= Orłów-Parcel =

- Village
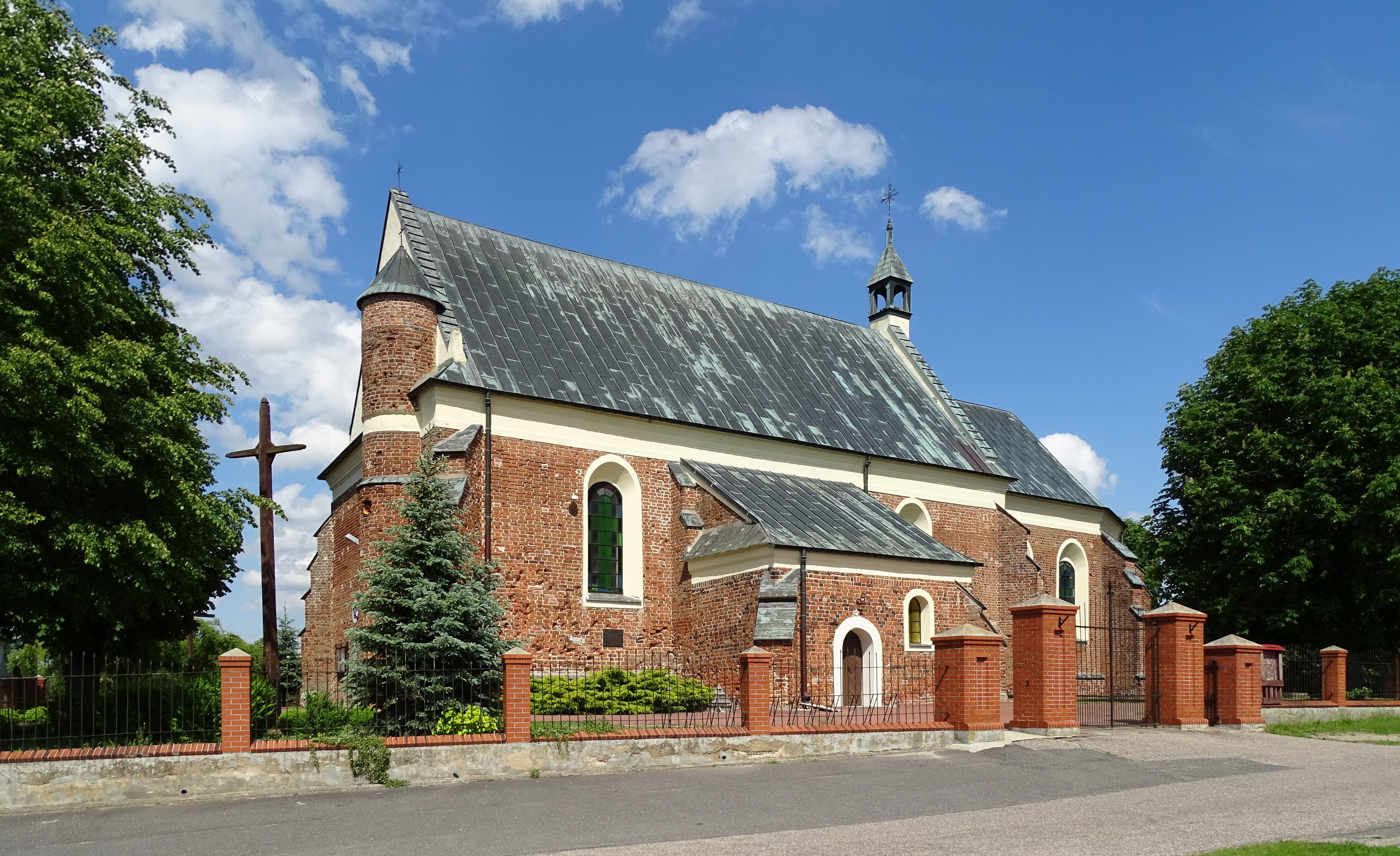
- Medieval Corpus Christi church

- Location within Poland
- Coordinates: 52°8′29″N 19°33′4″E
- Country: Poland
- Voivodeship: Łódź
- County: Kutno
- Gmina: Bedlno
- Time zone: UTC+1 (CET)
  - Summer (DST): UTC+2 (CEST)
- Vehicle registration: EKU

Orłów-Parcel [ˈɔrwuf ˈpart͡sɛl] is a village in the administrative district of Gmina Bedlno, within Kutno County, Łódź Voivodeship, in central Poland. It is located within the historic Łęczyca Land.

Orłów was a county seat and private town within the Łęczyca Voivodeship in the Greater Poland Province of the Kingdom of Poland.
