= Garbów, Kutno County =

Garbów
- Village
- Location within Poland
- Coordinates: 52°9′30″N 19°35′22″E
- Country: Poland
- Voivodeship: Łódź
- County: Kutno
- Gmina: Bedlno

Garbów [ˈɡarbuf] is a village in the administrative district of Gmina Bedlno, within Kutno County, Łódź Voivodeship, in central Poland.
