= Szewce Nagórne =

- Village
- Location within Poland
- Coordinates: 52°11′7″N 19°32′33″E
- Country: Poland
- Voivodeship: Łódź
- County: Kutno
- Gmina: Bedlno

Szewce Nagórne [ˈʂɛft͡sɛ naˈɡurnɛ] is a village in the administrative district of Gmina Bedlno, within Kutno County, Łódź Voivodeship, in central Poland.
