= Wyrów, Łódź Voivodeship =

Wyrów
- Village
- Location within Poland
- Coordinates: 52°13′25″N 19°31′34″E
- Country: Poland
- Voivodeship: Łódź
- County: Kutno
- Gmina: Bedlno

Wyrów [ˈvɨruf] is a village in the administrative district of Gmina Bedlno, within Kutno County, Łódź Voivodeship, in central Poland.
