= Janów, Gmina Bedlno =

Janów
- Village
- Location within Poland
- Coordinates: 52°13′22″N 19°34′4″E
- Country: Poland
- Voivodeship: Łódź
- County: Kutno
- Gmina: Bedlno

Janów [ˈjanuf] is a village in the administrative district of Gmina Bedlno, within Kutno County, Łódź Voivodeship, in central Poland.
