= Orłów, Łódź Voivodeship =

Orłów
- Village
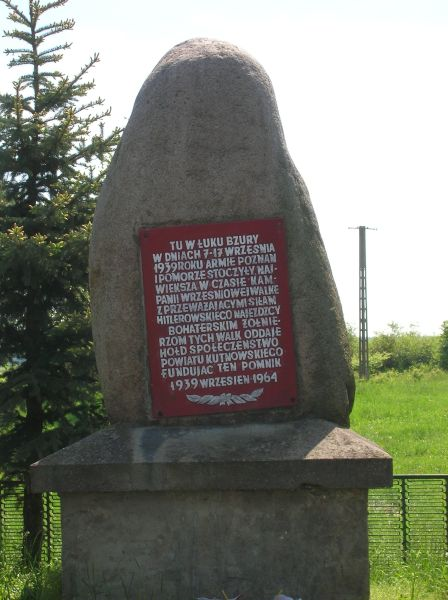

- Coat of arms

- Location within Poland
- Coordinates: 52°7′56″N 19°34′36″E
- Country: Poland
- Voivodeship: Łódź
- County: Kutno
- Gmina: Bedlno
- Population: 260

Orłów [ˈɔrwuf] is a village in the administrative district of Gmina Bedlno, within Kutno County, Łódź Voivodeship, in central Poland.
