= Tomczyce, Łódź Voivodeship =

Tomczyce
- Village
- Location within Poland
- Coordinates: 52°9′47″N 19°38′40″E
- Country: Poland
- Voivodeship: Łódź
- County: Kutno
- Gmina: Bedlno

Tomczyce [tɔmˈt͡ʂɨt͡sɛ] is a village in the administrative district of Gmina Bedlno, within Kutno County, Łódź Voivodeship, in central Poland.
