= Jaroszówka, Łódź Voivodeship =

Jaroszówka
- Village
- Location within Poland
- Coordinates: 52°9′7″N 19°33′55″E
- Country: Poland
- Voivodeship: Łódź
- County: Kutno
- Gmina: Bedlno

Jaroszówka [jarɔˈʂufka] is a village in the administrative district of Gmina Bedlno, within Kutno County, Łódź Voivodeship, in central Poland.
