= Ernestynów, Łódź Voivodeship =

Ernestynów
- Village
- Location within Poland
- Coordinates: 52°10′46″N 19°37′38″E
- Country: Poland
- Voivodeship: Łódź
- County: Kutno
- Gmina: Bedlno

Ernestynów [ɛrnɛsˈtɨnuf] is a village in the administrative district of Gmina Bedlno, within Kutno County, Łódź Voivodeship, in central Poland.
