= Kujawki, Łódź Voivodeship =

Kujawki
- Village
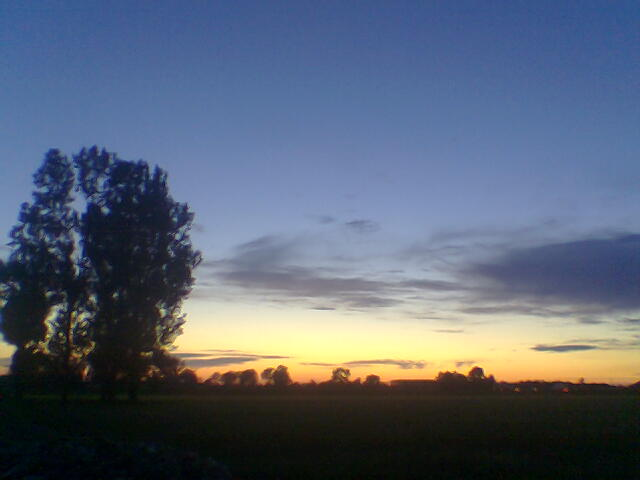

- Location within Poland
- Coordinates: 52°11′21″N 19°37′27″E
- Country: Poland
- Voivodeship: Łódź
- County: Kutno
- Gmina: Bedlno
- Population: 42

Kujawki [kuˈjafki] is a village in the administrative district of Gmina Bedlno, within Kutno County, Łódź Voivodeship, in central Poland.
