= Stanisławice, Kutno County =

Stanisławice
- Village
- Location within Poland
- Coordinates: 52°11′6″N 19°34′55″E
- Country: Poland
- Voivodeship: Łódź
- County: Kutno
- Gmina: Bedlno

Stanisławice [staniswaˈvit͡sɛ] is a village in the administrative district of Gmina Bedlno, within Kutno County, Łódź Voivodeship, in central Poland.
