= Florianów, Kutno County =

Florianów
- Village
- Location within Poland
- Coordinates: 52°13′25″N 19°32′22″E
- Country: Poland
- Voivodeship: Łódź
- County: Kutno
- Gmina: Bedlno
- Population (approx.): 160

Florianów [flɔˈrjanuf] is a village in the administrative district of Gmina Bedlno, within Kutno County, Łódź Voivodeship, in central Poland.

The village has an approximate population of 160.
