= Ruszki, Łódź Voivodeship =

Ruszki
- Village
- Location within Poland
- Coordinates: 52°13′48″N 19°30′50″E
- Country: Poland
- Voivodeship: Łódź
- County: Kutno
- Gmina: Bedlno

Ruszki [ˈruʂki] is a village in the administrative district of Gmina Bedlno, within Kutno County, Łódź Voivodeship, in central Poland.
