= Czarnów, Łódź Voivodeship =

Czarnów
- Village
- Location within Poland
- Coordinates: 52°9′39″N 19°33′38″E
- Country: Poland
- Voivodeship: Łódź
- County: Kutno
- Gmina: Bedlno

Czarnów [ˈt͡ʂarnuf] is a village in the administrative district of Gmina Bedlno, within Kutno County, Łódź Voivodeship, in central Poland.
