= Dębowa Góra, Kutno County =

Dębowa Góra
- Village
- Location within Poland
- Coordinates: 52°9′5″N 19°41′12″E
- Country: Poland
- Voivodeship: Łódź
- County: Kutno
- Gmina: Bedlno
- Population: 150

Dębowa Góra [dɛmˈbɔva ˈɡura] is a village in the administrative district of Gmina Bedlno, within Kutno County, Łódź Voivodeship, in central Poland.
