= Pniewo, Łódź Voivodeship =

Pniewo
- Village
- Location within Poland
- Coordinates: 52°12′16″N 19°36′47″E
- Country: Poland
- Voivodeship: Łódź
- County: Kutno
- Gmina: Bedlno

Pniewo [ˈpɲɛvɔ] is a village in the administrative district of Gmina Bedlno, within Kutno County, Łódź Voivodeship, in central Poland.
